= Colonial Village (disambiguation) =

Colonial Village is an area in northwest Washington, D.C.

Colonial Village may also refer to:

- Colonial Village, Lansing, Michigan, a neighborhood
- Colonial Village, New York, a hamlet in Lewiston
- Colonial Village, Knoxville, a neighborhood in Tennessee
- Colonial Village (Arlington, Virginia), a historic garden apartment complex
