= North Presbyterian Church =

North Presbyterian Church may refer to:

- Presbyterian Church in the United States of America, also known as the "Northern Presbyterian Church"
- North Presbyterian Church (Iowa City, Iowa), listed on the National Register of Historic Places (NRHP)
- Franklin Avenue Presbyterian Church, Lansing, Michigan, NRHP-listed, also known as "North Presbyterian Church"
- North Presbyterian Church (Omaha, Nebraska), NRHP-listed
- Hellenic Orthodox Church of the Annunciation, Buffalo, New York, also known as "North Presbyterian Church", NRHP-listed in Erie County
- North Presbyterian Church (Manhattan), a New York City congregation and one extant and two demolished churches belonging to it
- North Presbyterian Church, a defunct 19th-century congregation in Greenwich Village, New York City
- North Presbyterian Church (Cleveland, Ohio), NRHP-listed
