= New Covenant Christian School (Lansing, Michigan) =

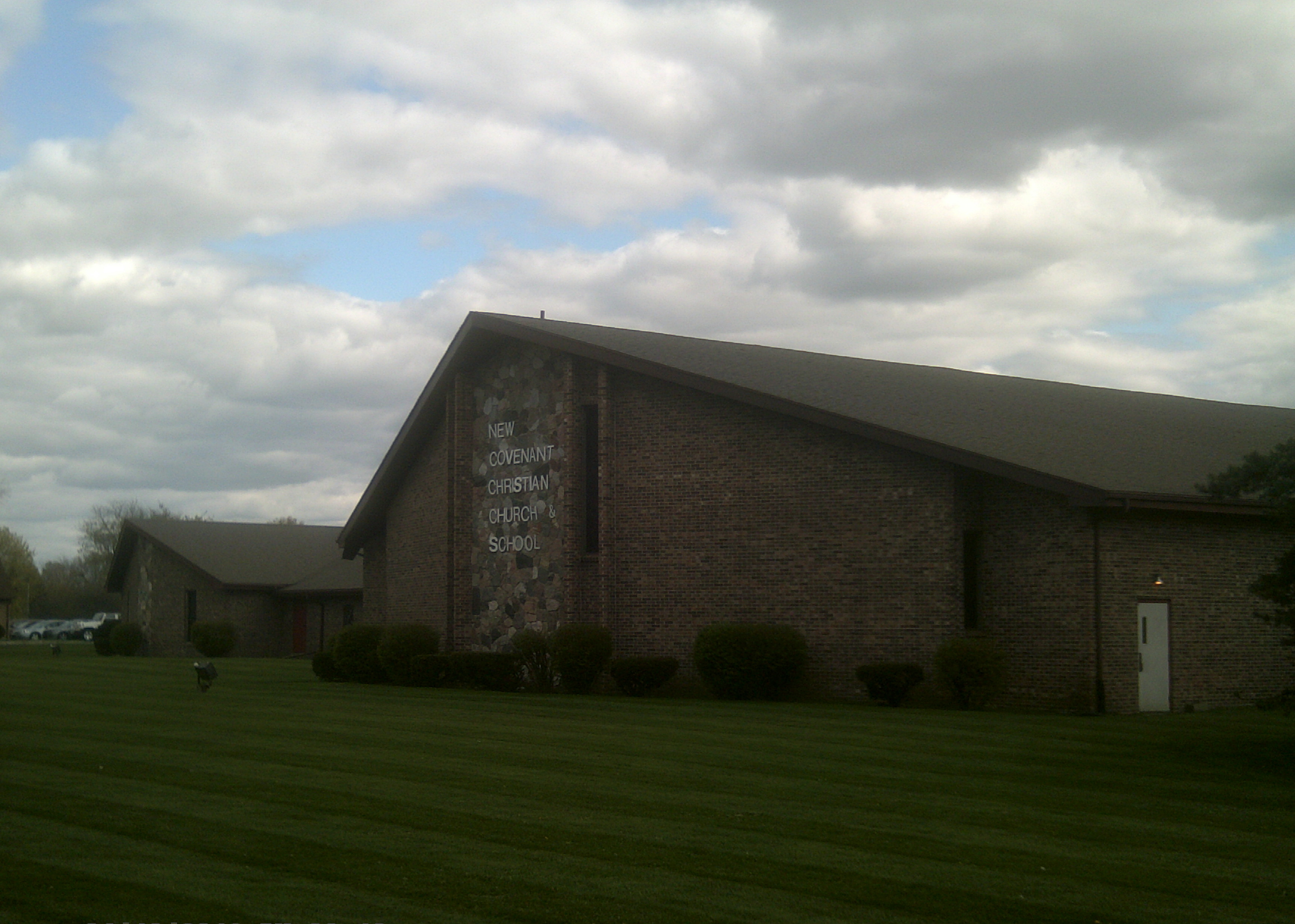
- Front of New Covenant building

Location
- 4415 W. St. Joseph Hwy; Lansing, Michigan 48917; United States
- Coordinates: 42.7260°N 84.6118°W

Information
- Type: Private
- Religious affiliation: Christianity
- Denomination: non-denominational
- Established: 1984
- Principal: Dalton Gatlin
- Staff: ~25 (including teachers)
- Teaching staff: 18
- Grades: K4-12
- Gender: co-ed
- Enrollment: ~150
- Language: English
- Colors: Red, Black and White
- Athletics conference: Michigan High School Athletic Association, Class D
- Nickname: NCCS
- Team name: Warriors
- Website: www.nccswarriors.org

New Covenant Christian School (NCCS) is a private Christian school located in Lansing, Michigan United States. Their address is 4415 W. St. Joseph Hwy. Lansing, MI 48917 The school was founded in 1984, and has currently about 150 co-ed Kindergarten through 12th grade students.

== Academics ==
New Covenant provides classes like World and US history, Algebra 1 and 2, Geometry, advanced math, calculus, Physical Science, Physics, Biology, and fine arts. The curriculum is Bible-based and in the secondary students have evidential and relational apologetics. As a classical school, students also take Logic, Rhetoric 1, Rhetoric 2, Junior Thesis, and Senior Thesis with a classically informed reading list for all Literature classes.

Great Schools students' parent reviews gave New Covenant Christian School a 4^{1/2} star rating.

== School clubs and school organizations ==
Worship team: On Wednesdays some students sing/play contemporary worship music in front of the school body.
