= Frandor Shopping Center =

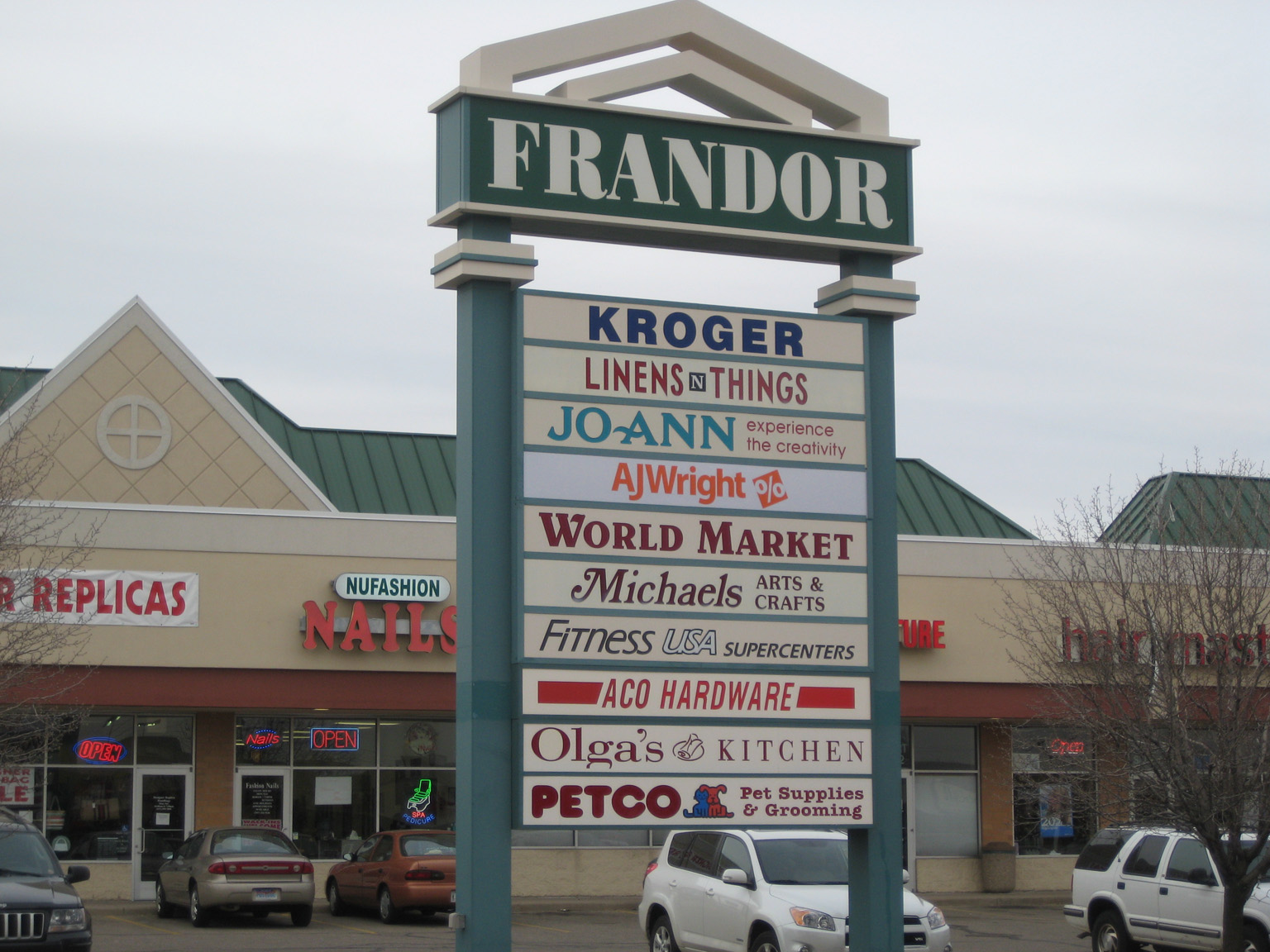
- Frandor entrance sign along North Clippert Street
- Location: Lansing, Michigan
- Coordinates: 42°44′16″N 84°30′23″W
- Address: 300 Frandor Avenue, Lansing, MI 48912-5290
- Opened: 1954
- Closed: 1998 (interior only)
- Manager: Corr Commercial Real Estate, Inc.
- Owner: Lansing Retail Center, LLC
- Num. of stores: 60
- Num. of anchor tenants: 7 (6 open, 1 vacant)
- Floor area: 450,000 sq ft (42,000 m^{2})
- Floors: 1
- Public transit: CATA

Frandor Shopping Center, in Lansing, Michigan, is located at the very eastern edge of the city bordering the neighboring city of East Lansing and freeway US Highway 127. It is a 450,000-square-foot (41,800 m^{2}) strip center anchored by a Kroger supermarket, HomeGoods, Michaels, Guitar Center, and Cost Plus World Market.

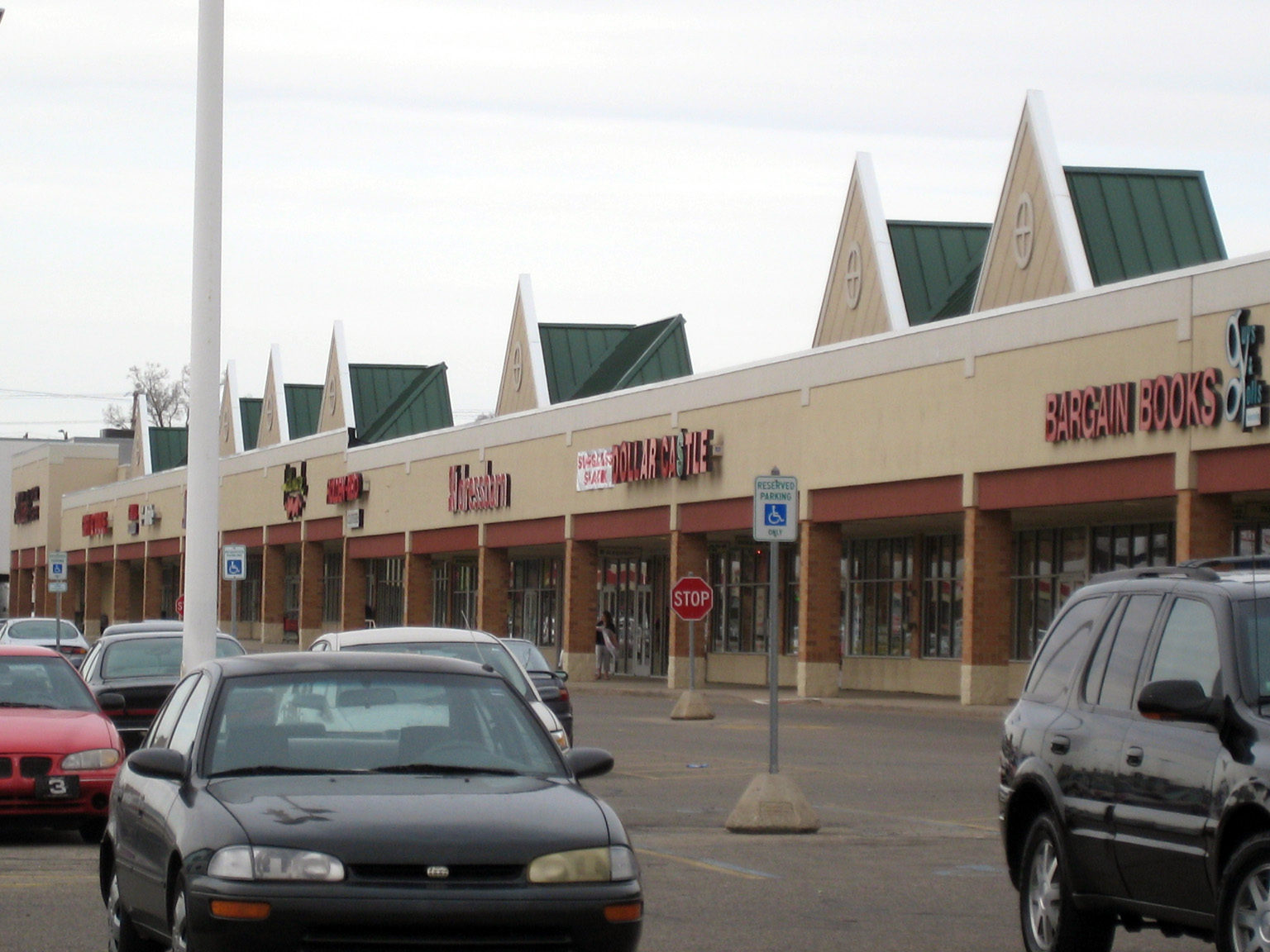
Storefronts along east end of Frandor Shopping Center

== History ==
Frandor was the first shopping center in Lansing and the second in Michigan, opening in 1954, shortly after Northland Center in Southfield, Michigan. The shopping center was originally owned by Francis J. Corr, and was named using a conjunction of his and his wife Dorothy's name.

Before beginning construction, Corr secured Sears as Frandor's anchor store. Corr negotiated a swap with the Sears in Lansing, buying the old store and selling the south 14.5 acres of the Frandor site to Sears. Corr then built and "fixtured" the new Sears store.

In 1972, the formerly open-air center was enclosed, and several new storefronts were added. This enclosure was removed in 1998, while adding several big-box stores to either end of Kroger, then the center's western anchor.

On November 7, 2019, it was announced that Sears would be closing this location a part of a plan to close 96 stores nationwide. The store closed in February 2020.

== Current development ==
Frandor has a variety of options for incoming businesses, allowing start-ups to lease a small space with the option to expand. The Frandor Merchant Association has a high participation level and meets regularly.

== Theatres ==
=== Spartan Twin ===
In 1967 the Spartan Twin (later Spartan Triplex) opened in the Frandor Shopping Center. The theater played the Rocky Horror Picture Show on Saturday nights. The establishment was closed in February 1994 and later used as a Discovery Zone.

=== The Odeon ===
The Odeon was a small film house in Frandor owned by Frank Leahey that featured foreign and independent films. It is no longer open.
