= Impression 5 Science Center =

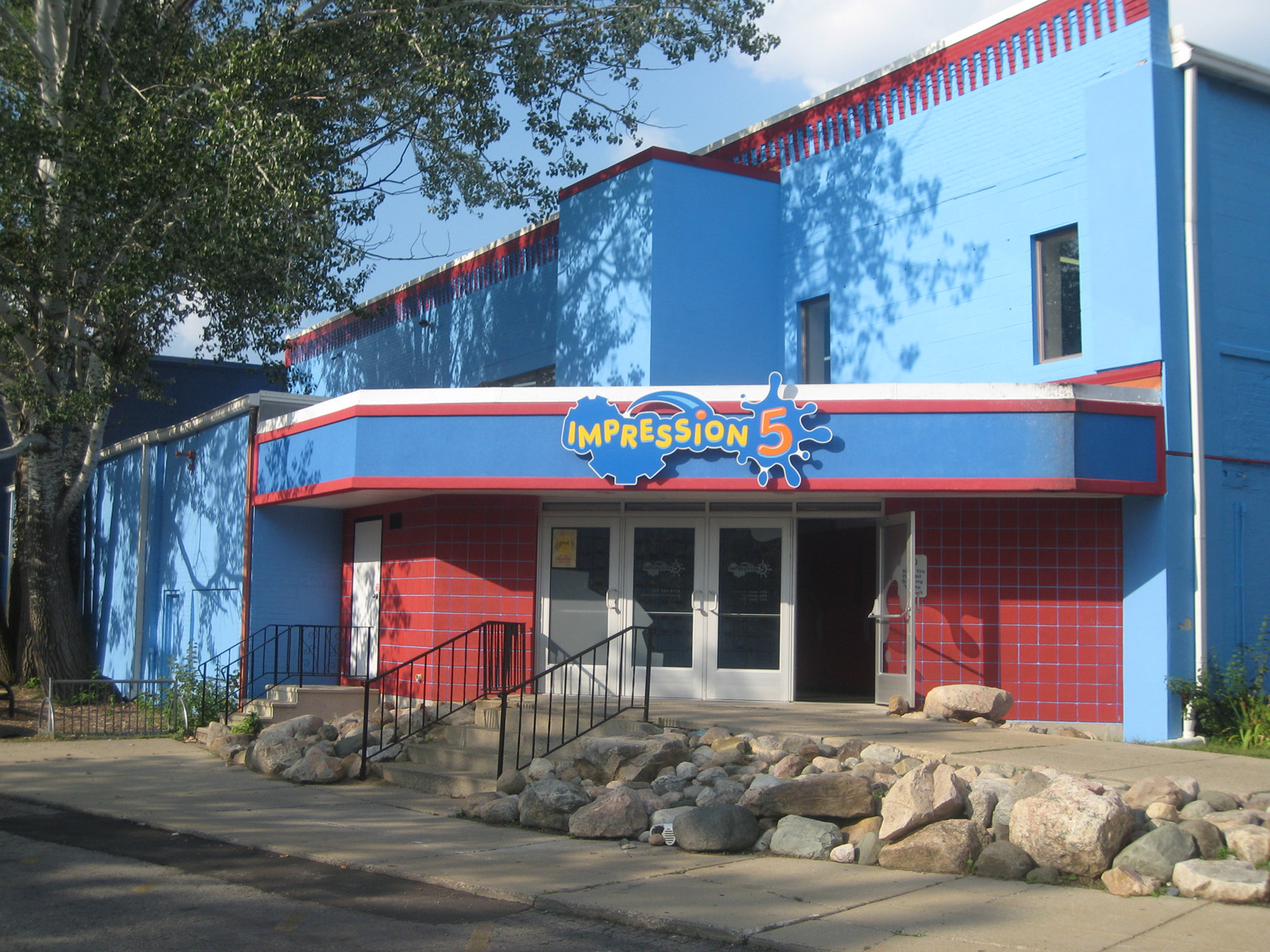
- Impression 5 Science Center entrance

- Location within Michigan
- Established: 1972
- Location: 200 Museum Drive; Lansing, Michigan
- Coordinates: 42.73232°N 84.54861°W
- Type: Science museum, Children's museum
- Visitors: ~3,000 Visitors per week
- Director: Erik Larson
- Public transit access: CATA
- Website: www.impression5.org

Voted #1 Best Children's Museum in the United States in 2025 by Newsweek, Impression 5 Science Center, is a hands-on science museum located in downtown Lansing, Michigan. Formerly known as the Impression 5 Museum, the center is located in a historic wagon works factory on the Grand River. The name, Impression 5, refers to the five senses. The Impression 5 Science Center has ~3,000 Visitors per week.

== History ==
The Impression 5 Science Center was founded by Marilynne Eichinger in her basement in Lansing, Michigan, in 1972. Eichinger graduated with a BA in sociology/anthropology from Boston University and an MA in counseling psychology from Michigan State University. As a mother of five she was influenced by the Montessori education her children received as well as the writings of Jean Piaget and Howard Gardner. Much of her life was surrounded by family and friends involved in physics and engineering and Eichinger became interested in developing a way to explain scientific principles that appeared so complex in a way that the general public could understand. She promoted the design and development of hands-on exhibits that challenged visitors thinking processes. The initial goal of Impression 5 was to develop fun, educational exhibits that focused on the five senses. A variety of approaches was offered to take into account individual learning styles.

The museum's first headquarters were in Marble School, East Lansing where volunteers housed displays and traveled to schools and shopping malls putting on small science exhibitions. In 1973 a 15,000 sq.ft warehouse was rented and filled with a variety of interactive displays. Over time, the museum was able to attract national attention along with funding for permanent and traveling exhibitions. It was not long before the museum ran out of space in the small warehouse. Impression 5 moved into its current 80,000 square foot building located on Museum Drive in downtown Lansing in 1982. It now offers classes, camps, teacher training workshops and traveling school programs that complement the exhibitions within its building. In 1994 the Impression 5 Museum changed its name to the current, Impression 5 Science Center.

== Exhibits ==
Current Exhibits

- Chew On This!
- Spectrum
- Nano
- Build Zone
- MI Nature
- First Impression Room
- POP! A Bubble Experience
- Giant Eye
- Throwing Things
- FLOW: A Water Experience
- Rotating Traveling Exhibits
- Smash: A Nuclear Adventure
- Megawatt
- Think Tank

== See also ==
- List of Museums in Michigan
- Lansing, Michigan Museums
- Science museum
- Children's museum
