= Clarkmobile =

Defunct American motor vehicle manufacturer

- Industry: Automotive
- Founded: 1902
- Founder: Frank Clark
- Defunct: 1905
- Fate: Reorganized into the New Way Motor Company; automotive assets sold to Deere-Clark
- Successor: New Way Motor Company, Deere-Clark
- Headquarters: Lansing, Michigan
- Products: Automobiles

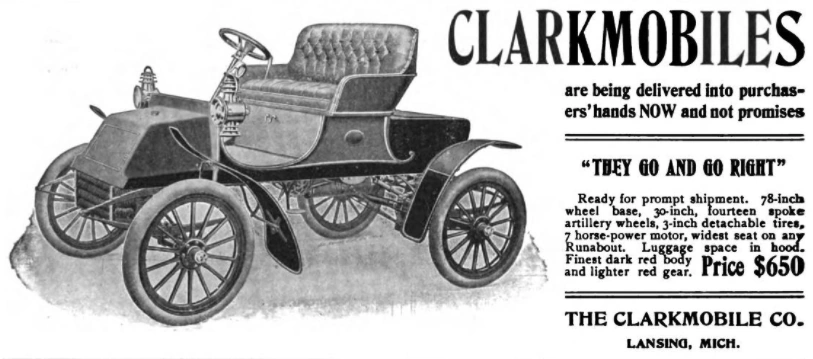
1904 Clarkmobile Advertisement

Clarkmobile was an automobile first built in 1902 by Frank Clark of Clark & Company in Lansing, Michigan. The first model became available in 1903. A newspaper article referred to the automobile as the 'Unbreakable Clarkmobile' and showed it surviving an accident.

Before the Clarkmobile, Clark & Company Carriage Works built the body for the first test car produced by Ransom E. Olds.

Production ceased in 1904. The Deere-Clark company purchased the company's tools and machinery. Frank Clark went on to make the Clark car in Shelbyville, Indiana.

== History ==
The Clarkmobile Co. was founded in April of 1902 in Lansing Michigan. The car was the brainchild of F. G. Clark who has been working on a prototype for two years. The company was incorporated with a capital of $50,000. The president would be A.C Stebbins, H.E. Thomas as vice president and F.G. Clark as secretary, treasurer and general manager.

In 1905 the Clarkmobile company would reorganize and be titled the New Way Motor Company. The new firm would be capitalized at $100,000 and would now produce air cooled gasoline engines. Stebbins would remain as president Clark would leave the firm to work for another successor company called Deere-Clark.

== The Clarkmobile ==
The Clarkmobile included a number of innovative features such as wheel steering, shaft drive, a front end with hood, and a new engine design.

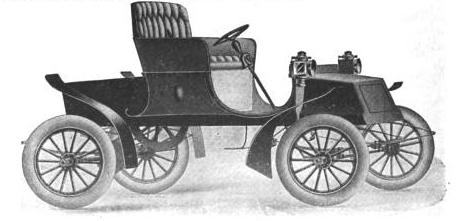
1903 Clarkmobile

The first model was exhibited around April of 1903. The car weighed 1,100 pounds. Powering the car was a 1 cylinder four stroke water cooled engine making 7 horsepower. The transmission was a Upton 2 speed planetary type with a reverse. The wheels were wood with Dunlop tires. A steering wheel was used instead of a tiller which was still fairly novel at the time. The wheelbase was 72 inches. The listed price for 1903 was $750 The front of the car like many early runabouts does not contain an engine, so that the front serves as a trunk.
