= Lansing, Michigan =

Capital city of Michigan, United States

- State capital city
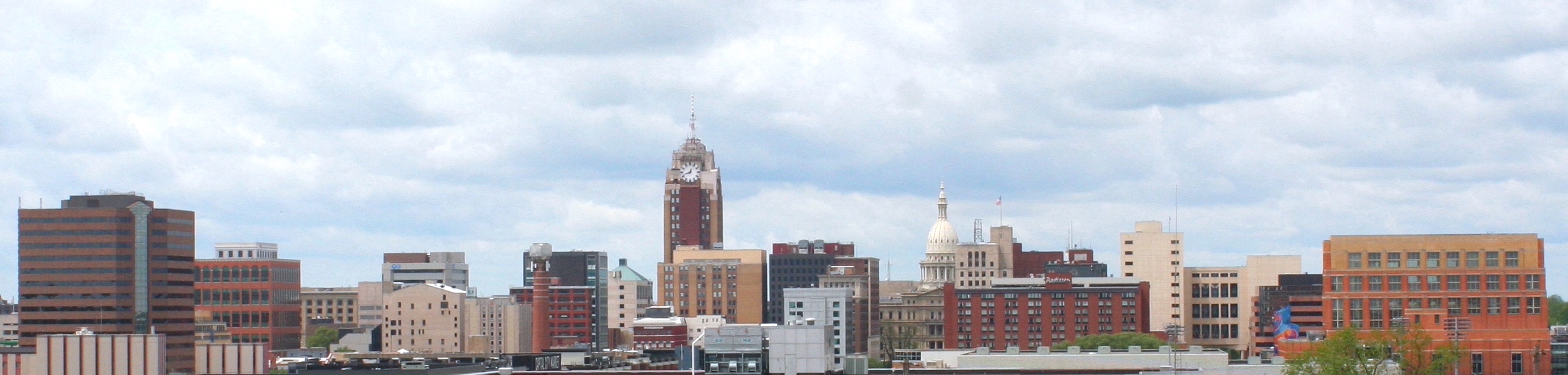
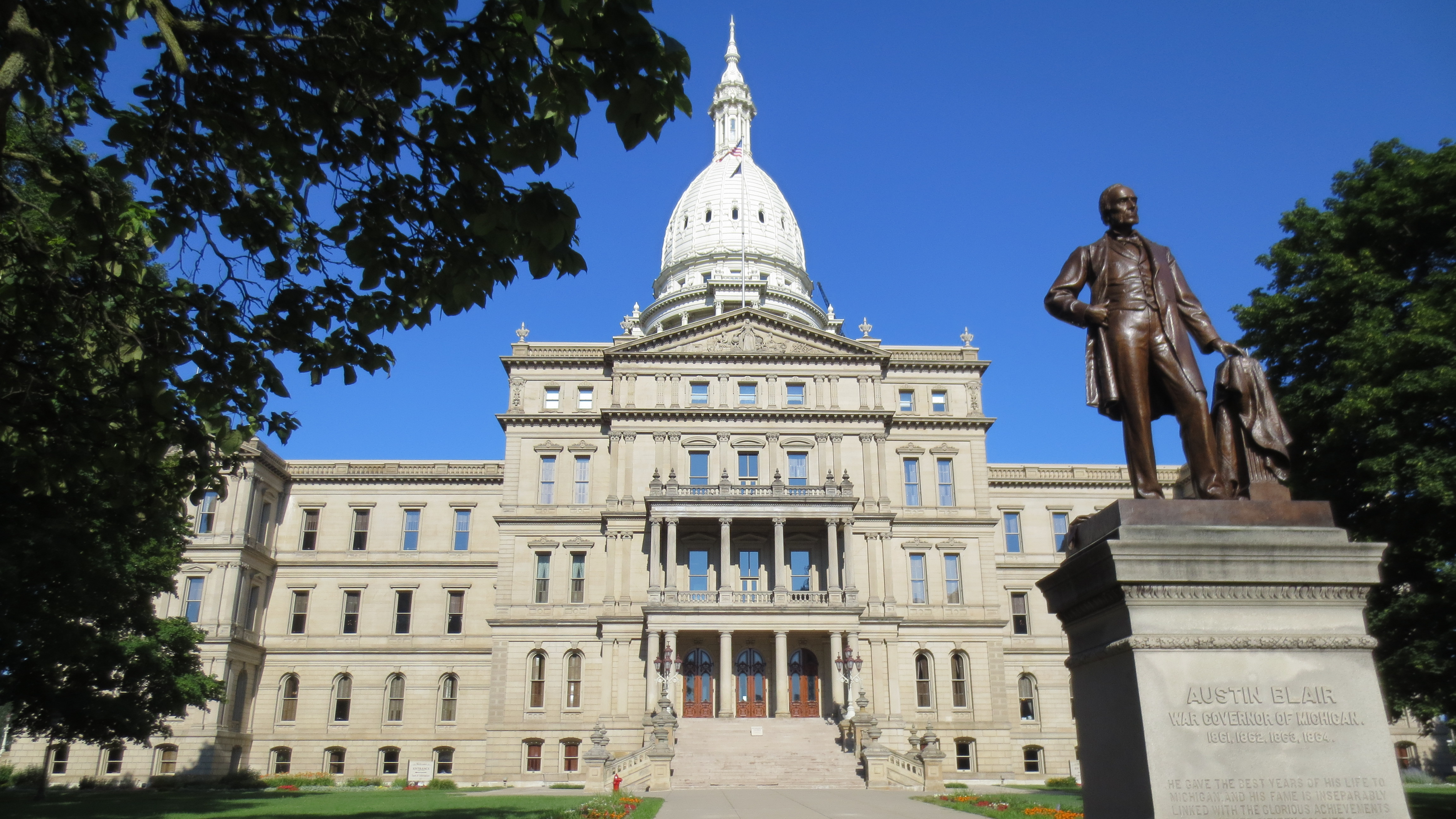
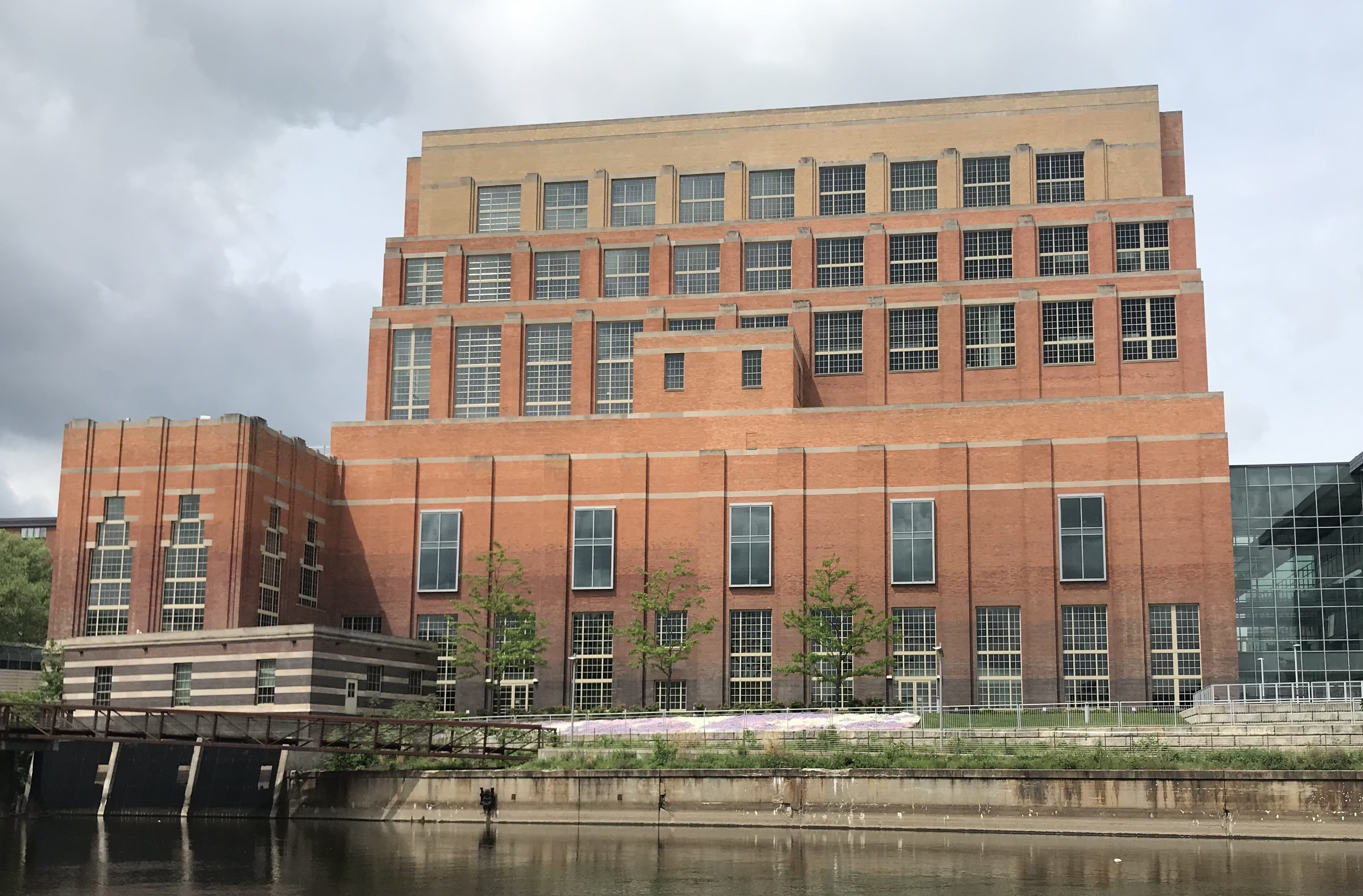
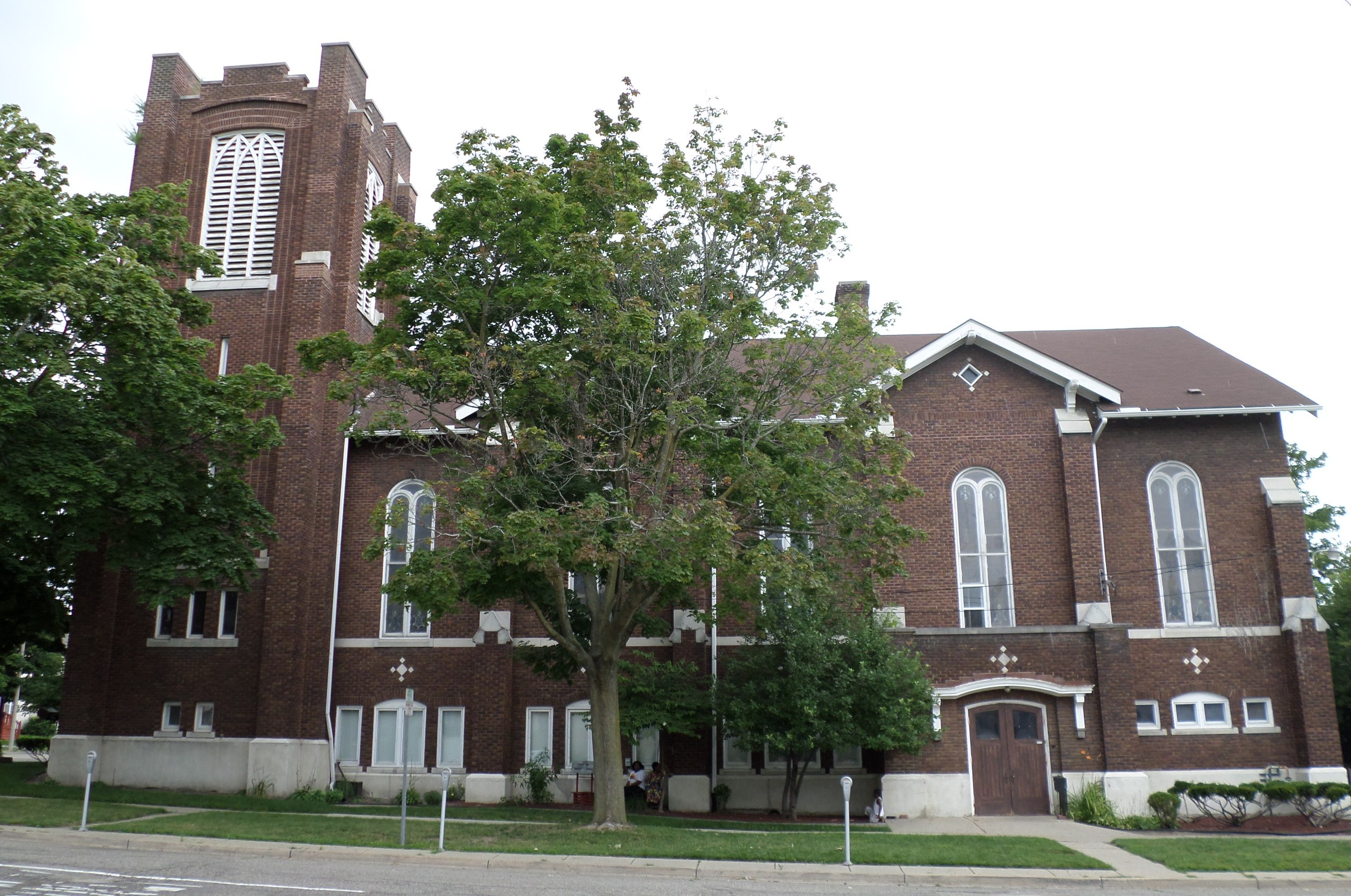
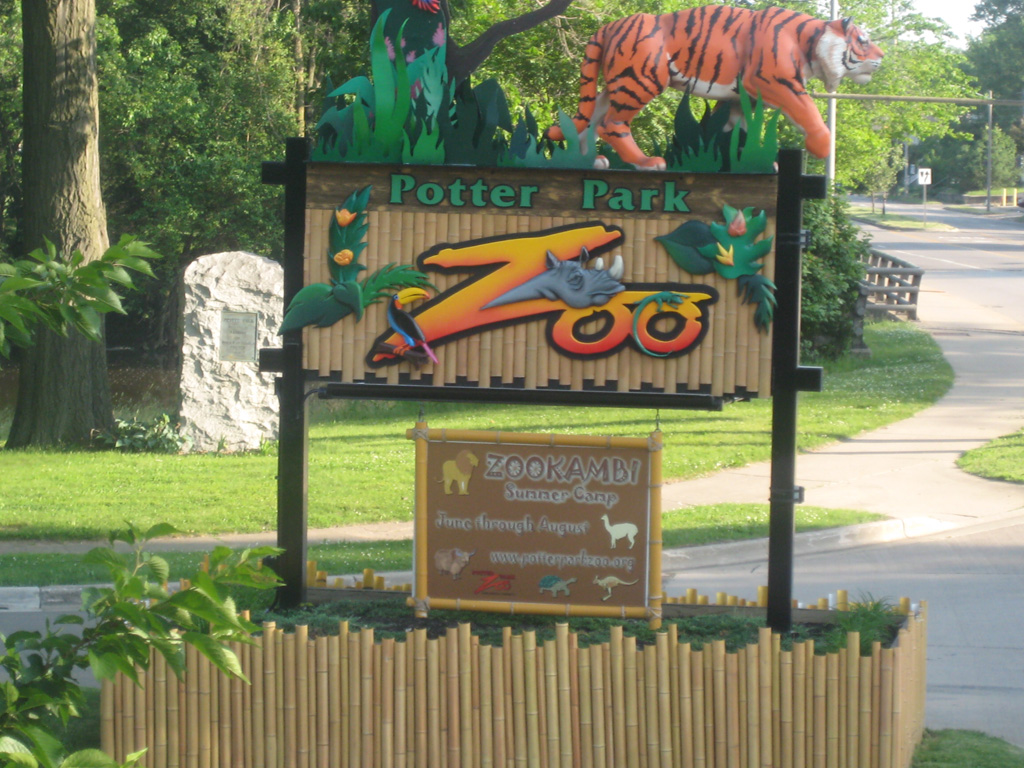
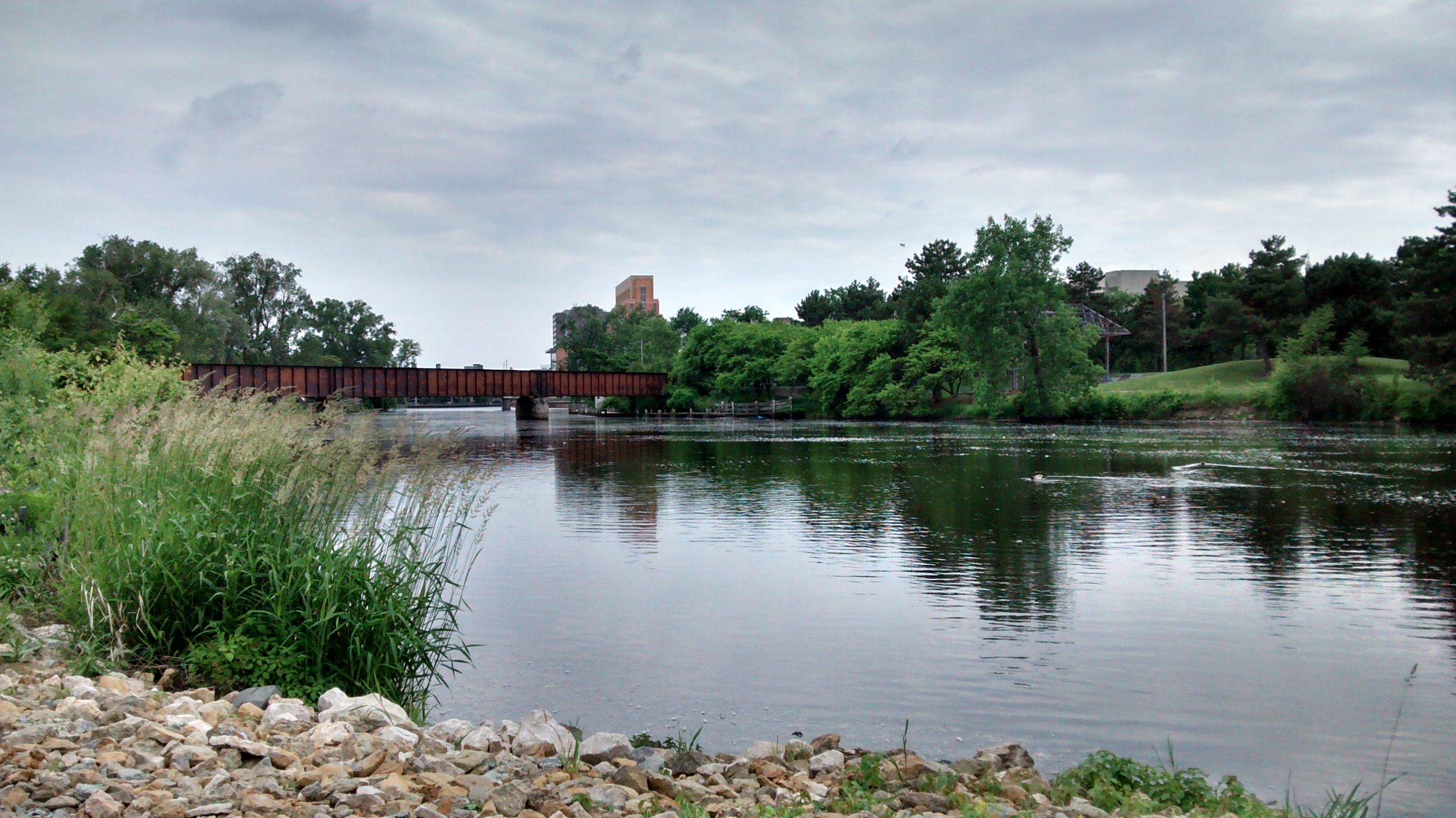
- The skyline of Downtown Lansing Michigan State Capitol Ottawa Street Power Station Franklin Avenue Presbyterian Church Potter Park Zoo Lansing River Trail

- Flag Seal Logo
- Nicknames: Capital City, L-Town, "The Heart of Michigan"
- Interactive map of Lansing, Michigan
- Location within the state of Michigan Location within the United States
- Coordinates: 42°42′51″N 84°33′36″W
- Country: United States
- State: Michigan
- Counties: Clinton, Eaton, and Ingham
- Settled: 1835
- Incorporated: 1859
- Named for: Lansing, New York

Government
  - Type: Strong mayor–council
  - Mayor: Andy Schor
  - Clerk: Chris Swope
  - City council: Members: Tamara Carter (At-Large); Jeremy Garza (At-Large); Clara Martinez (At-Large); Trini Pehlivanoglu (At-Large); Ryan Kost (1st Ward); Deyanira Nevarez Martinez (2nd Ward); Adam Hussain (3rd Ward); Peter Spadafore (4th Ward)

Area
  - City: 39.78 sq mi (103.03 km^{2})
  - Land: 39.14 sq mi (101.38 km^{2})
  - Water: 0.64 sq mi (1.65 km^{2})
  - Urban: 136.8 sq mi (354.4 km^{2})
  - Metro: 1,714.6 sq mi (4,440.8 km^{2})
- Elevation: 850 ft (260 m)

Population (2020)
  - City: 112,644
  - Density: 2,877.7/sq mi (1,111.09/km^{2})
  - Urban: 318,300 (US: 128th)
  - Urban density: 2,043/sq mi (788.7/km^{2})
  - Metro: 473,203 (US: 115th)
- Demonym(s): Lansingite, Lanstronaut (informal)
- Time zone: UTC−5 (EST)
  - Summer (DST): UTC−4 (EDT)
- ZIP Codes: 48901, 48906, 48908–48913, 48915–48919, 48921, 48922, 48924, 48929, 48930, 48933, 48937, 48950, 48951, 48956
- Area code: 517
- FIPS code: 26-46000
- GNIS feature ID: 1625035
- Website: lansingmi.gov

Lansing (/ˈlænsɪŋ/) is the capital city of the U.S. state of Michigan. It is the sixth-most populous city in Michigan with a population of 112,644 as of the 2020 census, and is the most populous city in Ingham County, though parts of the city extend into Eaton and Clinton counties. The Lansing–East Lansing metropolitan area has an estimated 473,000 residents and is the third largest in the state after metropolitan Detroit and Grand Rapids. Lansing benefits from its central location within Mid-Michigan and serves as a regional hub for government, education, insurance and commerce.

Founded in 1835 and designated as Michigan's state capital in 1847, Lansing was selected for its more central location after concerns about Detroit's vulnerability to British attack in the War of 1812. Lansing's history is closely tied to the rise of industry in Michigan; it became a prominent center in the automobile industry in the late 19th and early 20th centuries. Oldsmobile and REO Motor Car Company, both founded by Ransom E. Olds, were among its most prominent manufacturers.

Lansing's economy is diverse, driven by state government operations, higher education, health care, and insurance. Neighboring East Lansing is home to Michigan State University, one of the largest and most prominent research universities in the U.S. Major companies based in the city include Jackson National Life and Auto-Owners Insurance. Cultural attractions include the Michigan State Capitol building, the Impression 5 Science Center, and the Library of Michigan.

Lansing is the only U.S. state capital (among the 48 located in counties) that is not also a county seat; the seat of government of Ingham County is Mason, but the county maintains some offices in Lansing.

== History ==
=== Exploration by Europeans ===
The first recorded person of European descent to travel through the area that is now Lansing was British fur trader Hugh Heward and his French-Canadian team on April 24, 1790, while canoeing the Grand River. The land that was to become Lansing was surveyed as "Township 4 North Range 2 West" in February 1827 in what was then dense forest. It was the last of the county's townships to be surveyed, and the land was not offered for sale until October 1830. There would be no roads to this area for decades to come.

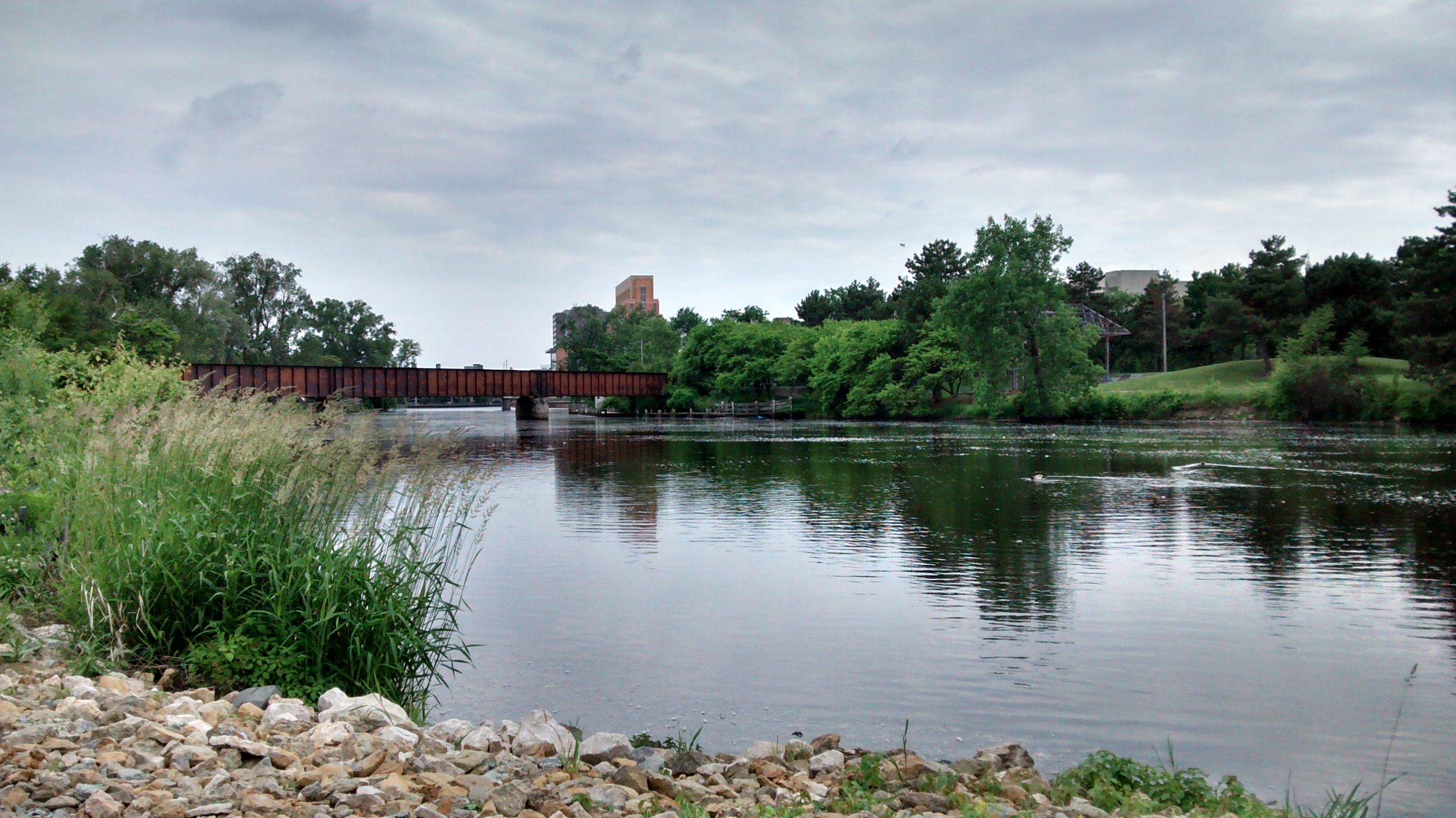
Grand River overlooking Lansing River Trail Bridge

=== Founding myth ===
Historians have lamented the persistence of a myth about Lansing's founding.

The incorrect story of Lansing's beginnings states that in the winter of 1835 and early 1836, two brothers from New York plotted the area now known as REO Town just south of downtown Lansing and named it "Biddle City". This land lay in a floodplain and was underwater during the majority of the year. Nevertheless, the brothers went back to Lansing, New York, to sell plots for the town that did not exist. They told the New Yorkers this new "city" had an area of 65 blocks, a church and a public and academic square. 16 men bought plots in the nonexistent city, and upon reaching the area later that year found they were the victims of the scam. Many in the group, disappointed and now without funds to move on again, opted to stay and ended up settling around what is now metropolitan Lansing.

The story has persisted due to a 1904 newspaper article, which cited a memoir told by Daniel W. Buck, a respected Lansing mayor and son of one of the early pioneers. His story was cited in Michigan pioneer papers and retold in newspaper articles multiple times in the decades that followed. His characterization of the city as being born from a "land scam" was incorrect, though his story had some elements of truth as well.

=== Origins as a town ===
The brothers were William and Jerry Ford. Although they were originally from New York, they were well-respected businessmen who hailed from Jackson and were instrumental during its earliest years.

In 1836, they bought 290 acres in the northwest corner of Ingham County. They platted the land and hoped to build a community they named Biddle City, located south of the convergence of the Grand River and the Red Cedar River, in Lansing's present-day REO Town neighborhood. Biddle City's plat map included plans for a public square, church square and academy square. They sold 21 parcels of it – mostly to other Michiganders, not New Yorkers – and buyers understood that it was not yet a real city. Unfortunately, Biddle City never took off. The financial Panic of 1837 forced the brothers to heavily mortgage the property, and the city never materialized.

Biddle City was not Lansing's original name, nor a precursor to it, as the plat was located outside of Lansing's original city limits.

Originally, all that existed was Lansing Township, named in 1842 by an early settler, Joseph E. North Sr., after Lansing in Tompkins County, NY, where he was from.

The settlement of fewer than 20 people that would become the City of Lansing remained quiet until the winter of 1847. The state constitution required the capital be moved from Detroit to a more central and safer location in the state's interior in 1847; many were concerned about Detroit's proximity to British-controlled Canada, which had captured Detroit in the War of 1812. The United States had recaptured the city in 1813, but these events led to the dire need to have the center of government relocated further away from hostile British territory. There was also concern with Detroit's strong influence over Michigan politics, being the state's largest city as well as the capital city.

During the multi-day session to determine a new location for the state capital, many cities, including Ann Arbor, Marshall, and Jackson, lobbied hard to win this designation. Unable to publicly reach a consensus because of constant political wrangling, the Michigan House of Representatives privately chose the Township of Lansing out of frustration. When announced, many present openly laughed that such an insignificant settlement was now Michigan's capital. Two months later, Governor William L. Greenly signed into law the act of the legislature making Lansing Township the state capital.

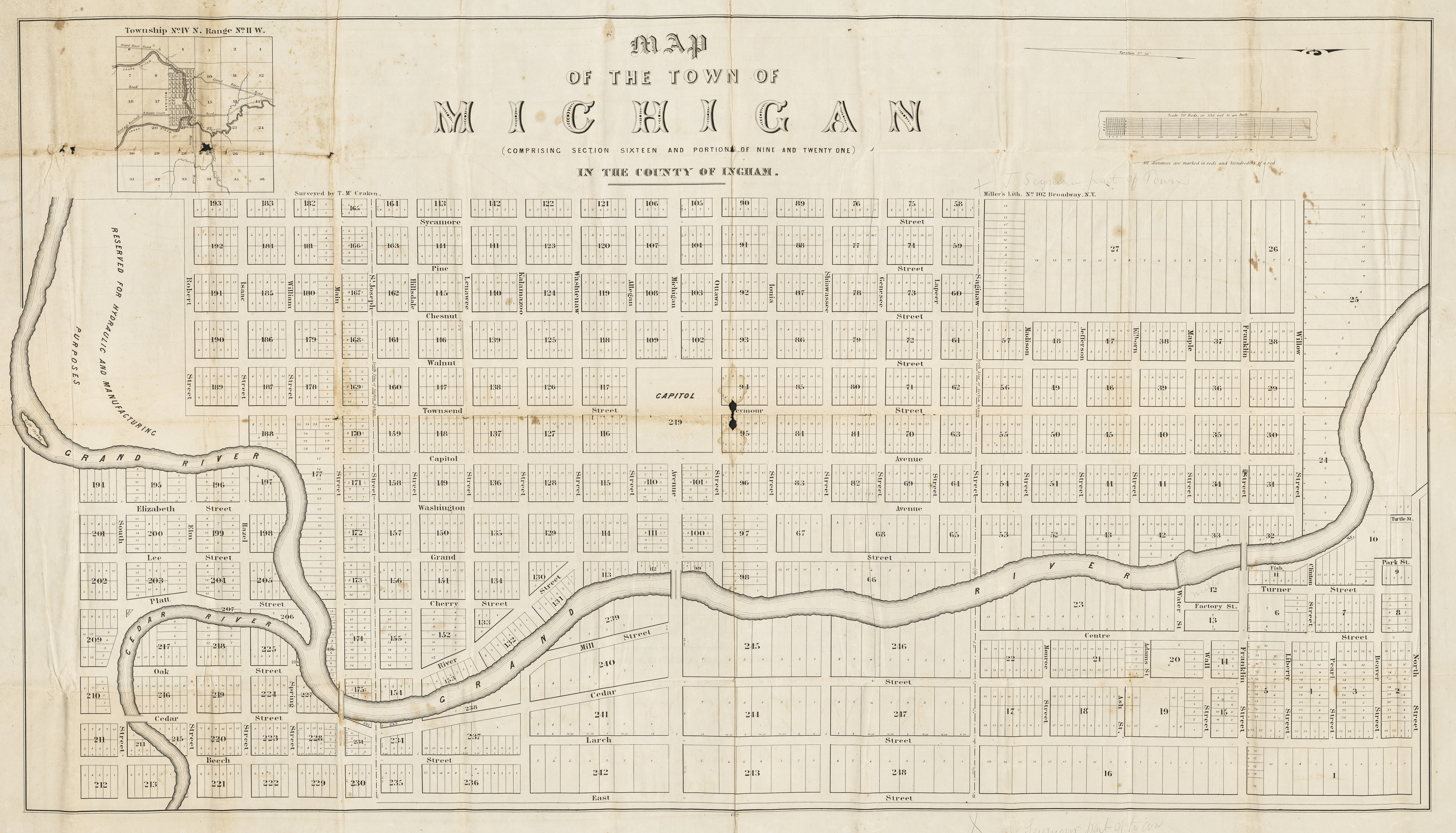
An 1847 plat map of "the town of Michigan", prior to the selection of "Lansing" as the capital's name the following year. (The map is oriented with north to the right.)

With the announcement that Lansing Township had been made the capital, the small settlement quickly transformed into the seat of state government. Within months after it became the capital city, further individual settlements began to develop around it, along three key points along the Grand River in the township:

- "Lower Village/Town", where present-day Old Town stands, was the oldest of the three villages. It was home to the first house built in Lansing in 1843 by pioneer James Seymour and his family. Lower Town began to develop in 1847 with the completion of the Franklin Avenue (now Grand River Avenue) covered bridge over the Grand River.
- "Upper Village/Town", where present-day REO Town stands at the confluence of the Grand River and the Red Cedar River. It began to take off in 1847 when the Main Street Bridge was constructed over the Grand River. This village's focal point was the Benton House, a 4-story hotel, which opened in 1848. It was the first brick building in Lansing and was later razed in 1900.
- Michigan State Capitol
  "Middle Village/Town", where downtown Lansing now stands, was the last of the three villages to develop in 1848 with the completion of the Michigan Avenue bridge across the Grand River and the completion of the temporary capitol building which sat where Cooley Law School stands today on Capitol Avenue between Allegan and Washtenaw Streets, and finally the relocation of the post office to the village in 1851. This area would grow to become larger than the other two villages up and down river.

The collection of original settlements ("Upper Town", "Lower Town" and "Middle Town") had for some years been collectively referred to as the "Village of Michigan". On February 16, 1842, Alaiedon township was split into the townships of Lansing, Delhi and Meridian (originally suggested as "Genoa") based on a petition submitted in December 1841 by Henry North, Roswell Everett and Zalmon Holmes. Henry North proposed the name "Lansing" for the township at the request of his father, who wanted it named after their old town of Lansing, New York.

On February 15, 1859, the settlement, having grown to nearly 3,000 and encompassing about seven square miles (18 km^{2}) in area, was incorporated as a city, carving off a section of seven square miles from Lansing Township. The boundaries of the original city were Douglas Avenue to the north, Wood and Regent streets to the east, Mount Hope Avenue to the south, and Jenison Avenue to the west. These boundaries would remain until 1916. Lansing began to grow steadily over the next two decades with the completion of the railroads through the city, a plank road, and the completion of the current capitol building in 1878.

Most of what is known as Lansing today is the result of the city becoming an industrial powerhouse which began with the founding of Olds Motor Vehicle Company in August 1897. The company went through many changes, including a buyout, between its founding to 1905 when founder Ransom E. Olds started his new REO Motor Car Company, which would last in Lansing for another 70 years. Olds would be joined by the less successful Clarkmobile around 1903. Over the next decades, the city would be transformed into a major American industrial center for the manufacturing of automobiles and parts, among other industries. The city also continued to grow in area. By 1956, the city had grown to 15 square miles (39 km^{2}), and doubled in size over the next decade to its current size of roughly 33 square miles (85 km^{2}).

Today, the city's economy is diversified among government service, healthcare, manufacturing, insurance, banking, and education.

=== Notable events ===
==== Anti-slavery movement ====
In the late 1840s to early 1850s, the citizens of Lansing were unified against slavery, and the city became a secondary stop on the Underground Railroad, as one of the last steps of an escape route that led through Battle Creek, Schoolcraft and Cassopolis. From Lansing, the route led to Durand, and then to either Port Huron or Detroit.

==== Major fires ====
The Kerns Hotel fire on December 11, 1934, was the deadliest in the city's history. Perhaps thirty-four people died in the fire, although the hotel register was also destroyed making an exact count impossible.

On February 8, 1951, the Lewis Cass Building was intentionally set on fire by a state office employee. The following morning, the seventh floor collapsed down to the next level, which destroyed a large number of state historical records.

==== Elephant incident ====
On September 26, 1963, a 12-year-old, 3,000-pound female dancing elephant named Rajje (alternately reported as Raji and Little Rajjee, among other variations) rebelled against her trainer during a performance in a shopping-center circus near what was then Logan Street and Holmes Road in Lansing, and escaped into the streets, aggravated by the frenzied pursuit of nearly 4,000 local residents. The incident ended with the shooting of the elephant by Lansing police. Provoked by the growing crowd, Rajje's rampage took her through the men's wear, sporting goods and gift departments of a local Arlan's discount store before leading police on a two-mile chase in which she knocked down and injured a 67-year-old man, tried to move a car, and caused thousands of dollars in damage before being killed.

Life Magazine quoted Rajje's trainer, William Pratt, as shouting at the scene, "Damn these people [...] They wouldn't leave her alone."

The incident was widely reported, including a photospread in Life. While the Lansing State Journal coverage stressed the danger of the incident, the Detroit Free Press noted that witnesses cried out "Murderers! Murderers!" as police fired eight shots.

Author Nelson Algren cites the injustice and sad end of the pursuit of "Raji, the Pixie-Eared Elephant" in continuity with the ambush of Bonnie Parker and Clyde Barrow in his introduction to a 1968 biography of the outlaws. Then-teenage Lansing residents who had goaded the elephant, later on recalled the incident with sober regret in a local newspaper retrospective in 2011.

== Geography ==
Lansing is the centerpiece of a region of Michigan known as Mid-Michigan.

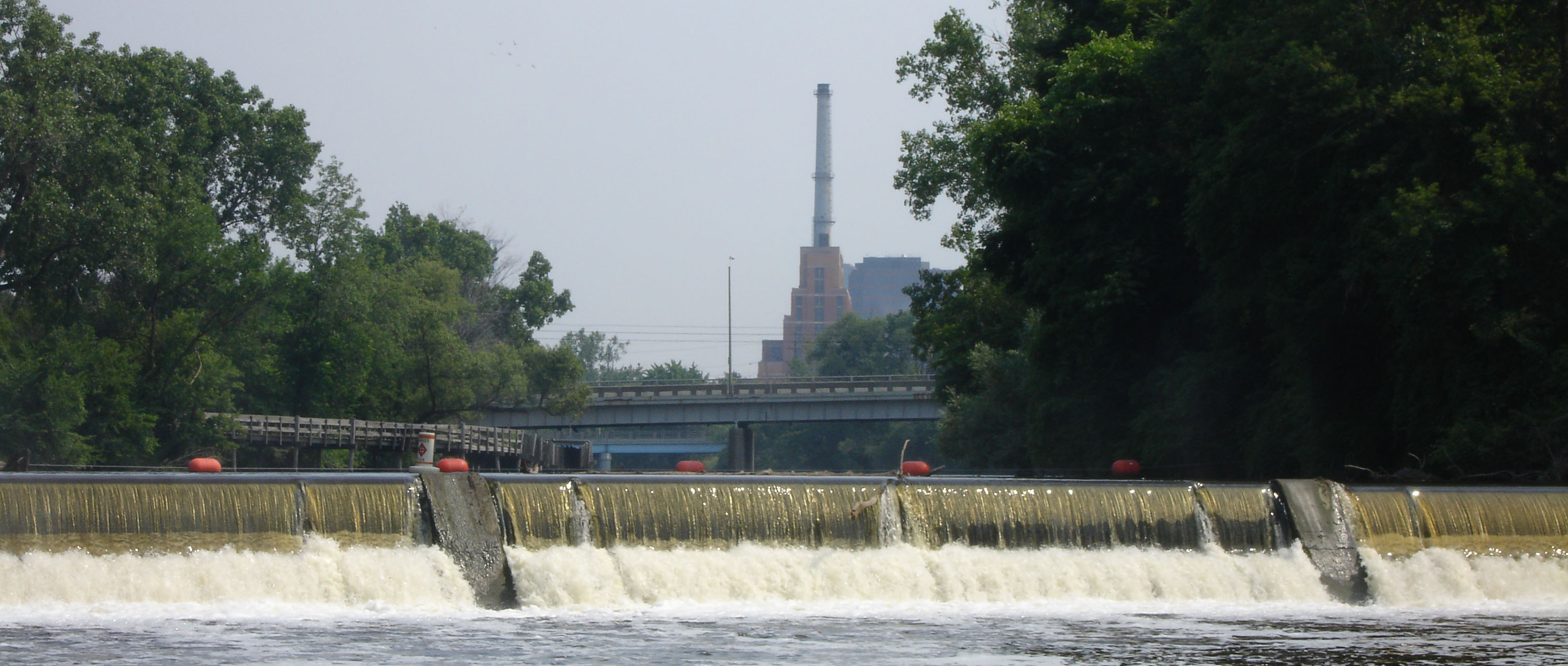
The North Lansing dam of the Grand River. The Lansing River Trail and Ottawa Street Power Station are visible behind.

According to the United States Census Bureau, the city has a total area of 36.68 square miles (95.00 km^{2}), of which 36.05 square miles (93.37 km^{2}) is land and 0.63 square miles (1.63 km^{2}) is water. This figure includes two 425 Agreements with Alaiedon Township and Meridian Township, and the four 425 Agreements with Delta Township since 2000.

Since the 2010 census, the city has entered into two additional 425 Agreements. The first agreement consisted of the temporary transfer of 1,888.2 acres of Lansing Capital Region International Airport to the city from DeWitt Township in 2011. The second agreement consisted of the temporary transfer of 41 acres (17 ha) in Alaiedon Township for the expansion of the headquarters of Jackson National Life Insurance Company in 2013 bringing the area either fully or conditionally under control of the city to 39.69 square miles (102.80 km^{2}).

Under Michigan law, 425 Agreements are only temporary land sharing agreements and do not count as official annexations. The Census Bureau, however, for statistical purposes does count these as annexations. Not counting the temporary 425 Agreements, Lansing administers 34.1 square miles (88 km^{2}) total.

Lansing is located in the south-central part of the Lower Peninsula of Michigan, where the Grand River meets the Red Cedar River. The city occupies most of what had formerly been part of Lansing Charter Township. It has also annexed adjacent tracts of land in Delta Charter Township and Windsor Township in Eaton County to the west, Delhi Charter Township in Ingham County to the south, and in DeWitt Charter Township in Clinton County to the north. The city also controls three non-contiguous tracts of land through 425 Agreements (conditional land transfer agreements) with Meridian Charter Township, Delta Charter Township, and Alaiedon Township in Ingham County to the southeast. It is also located between the state's two largest cities, Detroit and Grand Rapids.

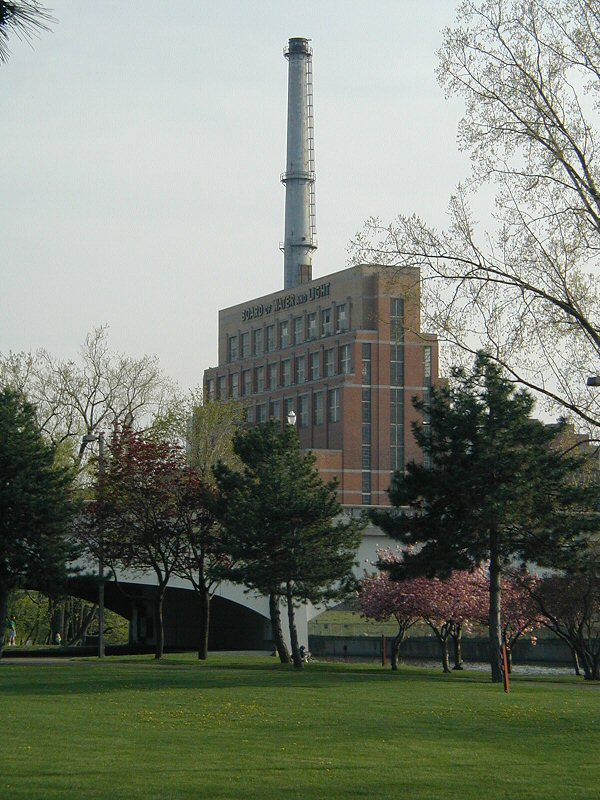
Lansing BWL's Ottawa Street Power Station

The Grand River, the largest river in Michigan, flows through downtown Lansing, and the Red Cedar River, a tributary of the Grand, flows through the campus of Michigan State University to its confluence with the Grand in Lansing. Sycamore Creek, a tributary of the Red Cedar, flows northward through the southeastern part of the city. There are two lakes in the area, Park Lake and Lake Lansing, both northeast of the city. Lake Lansing is approximately 500 acres (2.0 km^{2}) in size and is a summer favorite for swimmers, boaters, and fishermen. Michigan State University Sailing Club and the Lansing Sailing Club are located on Lake Lansing, where sailing regattas are hosted throughout the summer.

The City of Lansing operates a total of 3.55 square miles (9.2 km^{2}) of parkland, of which 2.80 square miles (7.3 km^{2}) is parkland, 0.43 square miles (1.1 km^{2}) are golflands, and 0.31 square miles (0.80 km^{2}) are cemetery lands. However, this figure includes the Waverly Hills Golf Course and adjacent Michigan Avenue Park, whose 0.18 square miles (0.47 km^{2}) are located within neighboring Lansing Township, but operated by the City of Lansing, and does not include the 0.18 square miles (0.47 km^{2}) of the combined Hawk Island County Park and adjacent Soldan Dog Park operated by Ingham County within the city of Lansing. All together then, 3.55 square miles (9.2 km^{2}) of the city (or approximately 10%) is publicly administered open space.

=== Neighborhoods ===
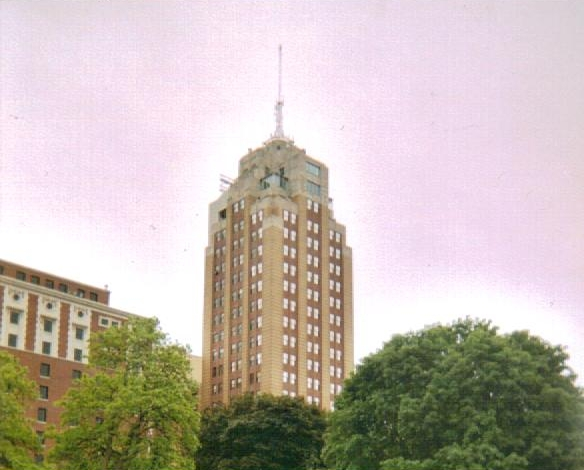
Boji Tower, Lansing's tallest building, located downtown

The city's downtown is dominated by state government buildings, especially the State Capitol; but downtown has also experienced recent growth in new restaurants, retail stores and residential developments. Downtown Lansing had a historic city market that was one of the oldest continuously operating farmers' markets in the United States, until it closed in 2019. Downriver and north of downtown is historic Old Town Lansing with many architecturally significant buildings dating to the mid-19th century. Directly south of downtown on the other side of I-496 along Washington Avenue lies "REO Town", the birthplace of the automobile in the United States, is where Ransom Eli Olds built factories along Washington Avenue. Ransom Eli Olds' home, which once overlooked the factories along Washington Avenue, was displaced by I-496.

Lansing is generally divided into four sections: the Eastside, Westside, Northwestside, and Southside. Each section contains a diverse array of neighborhoods. The Eastside, located east of the Grand River and north of the Red Cedar River, is the most ethnically diverse side of Lansing, with foreign-born citizens making up more of its population than any other side in the city. The Eastside's commercial districts are located mainly along Michigan Avenue, and to a lesser extent along Kalamazoo Street. It is anchored by Frandor Shopping Center on the very eastern edge of the eastside.

The Westside, roughly located north, west, and south of the Grand River as it curves through the city, is sometimes regarded as the city's most socio-economically diverse section. This side also contains Lansing's downtown area, though this neighborhood is often included as an area all its own. Outside downtown, this side is largely a collection of residential neighborhoods and is served by only one other commercial area along Saginaw Street. However, it also includes a small part of the Old Town Commercial Association.

The Northwestside, generally located north of the Grand River, with the city limits defining its north and western borders, is physically the smallest side of the city. This part of the city includes moderate-density residential areas and some green areas. North of Grand River Avenue, the main street of the side, lie warehouses and light industrial areas served by a major rail line that runs through Lansing. The most notable landmark of this side is Lansing's airport: Capital Region International Airport.

The Southside, usually described as the neighborhoods located south of the Grand and Red Cedar rivers and the I-496 freeway, is physically the largest and most populous side of the city. The area is largely residential in nature (south of Mount Hope Road near the northern edge) and is served by numerous commercial strips along Cedar Street, Martin Luther King Jr. Boulevard, Pennsylvania Avenue, and Waverly Road, which run north–south. The large Edgewood District is located in the southernmost part of the Southside and is sometimes referred to as South Lansing. Though it is the largest area of the city by both physical size and population, it has often been regarded by Southside citizens as Lansing's most overlooked and forgotten area, as most of Lansing's attention in recent decades has been put into the revitalization of the city's historic core located mostly on small parts of both the East and Westside.

The middle of the Southside—South-Central Lansing—contains the Old Everett Area. This location once contained the Everett School District and was annexed into the city in 1948.

Unincorporated areas adjacent to Lansing include parts of Lansing Charter Township, such as the unincorporated community of Edgemont Park, as well as parts of Delta Charter Township, such as the unincorporated community of Waverly. Though they are not part of the City of Lansing, these unincorporated communities often use Lansing mailing addresses.

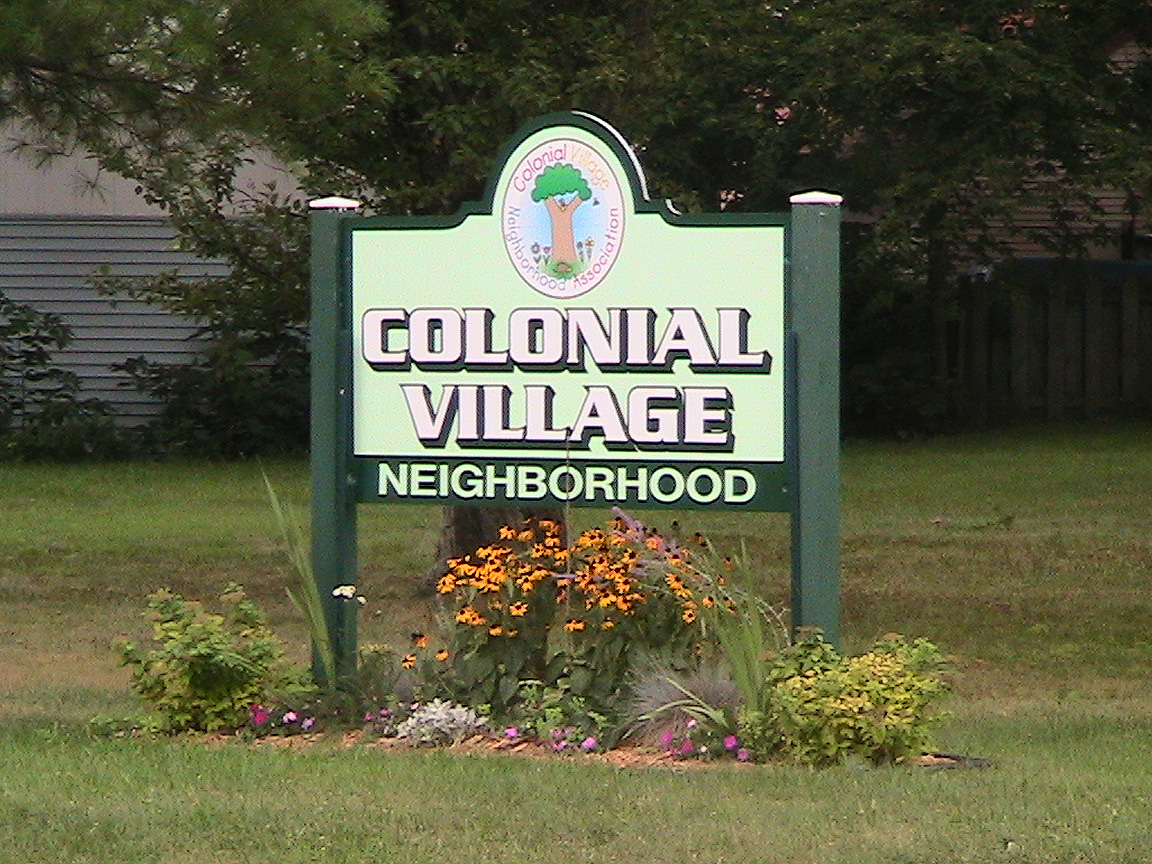
Colonial Village

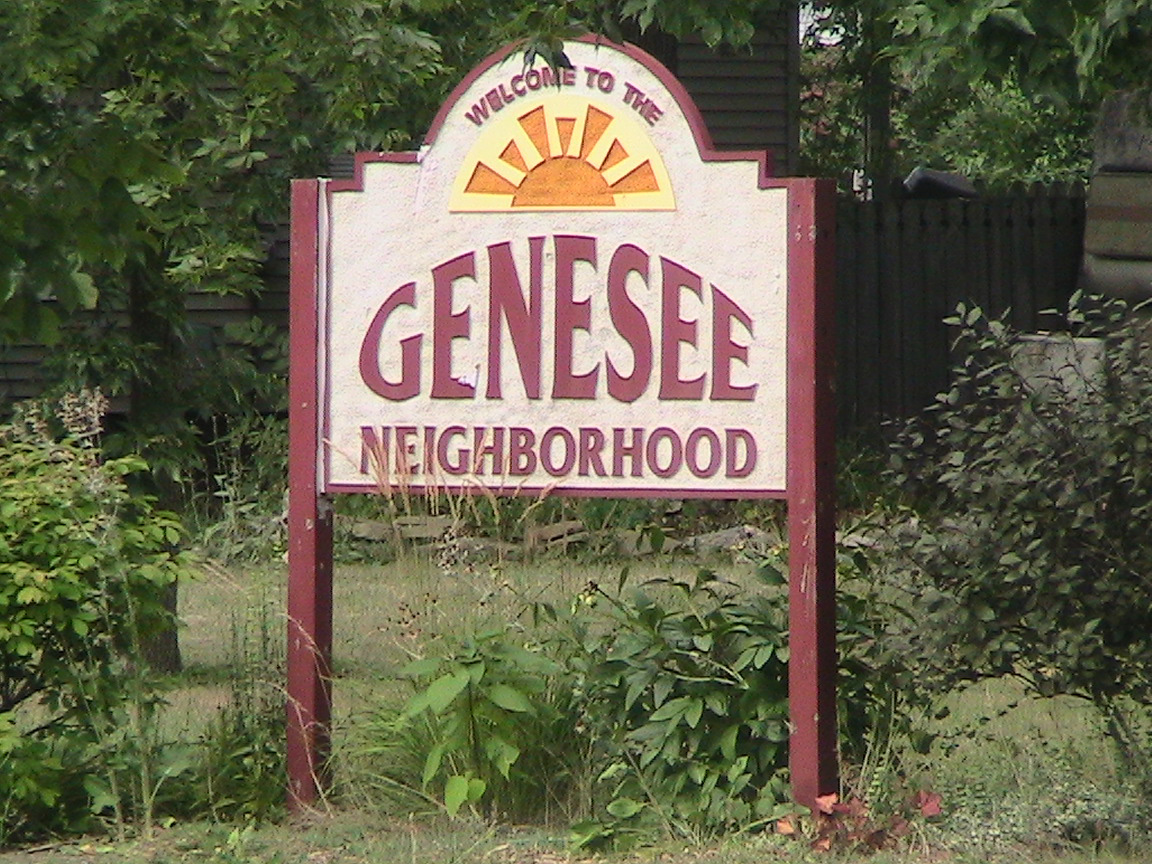
Genesee Neighborhood

==== Districts ====
- Cherry Hill
- Churchill Downs
- Colonial Village
- Eastside
- Edgewood
- Genesee
- Gier Park
- Hosmer
- Lansing-Eaton
- Moores Park
- Museum District
- Old Everett
- Old Town
- REO Town
- Stadium District
- Walnut
- Washington Square
- Westside

=== Climate ===
Climate chart for Lansing

Lansing has a Midwestern humid continental climate (Köppen Dfb/Dfa) that is influenced by the Great Lakes, and is part of USDA Hardiness zone 5b. Winters are cold with moderate to heavy snowfall, while summers are very warm and humid. The monthly daily average temperature in July is 71.5 °F (21.9 °C), while the same figure for January is 23.4 °F (−4.8 °C); the annual mean is 48.21 °F (9.01 °C). On average, temperatures reach or exceed 90 °F (32.2 °C) on 8.8 days of the year and drop to or below 0 °F (−17.8 °C) on 10.5 nights. Precipitation is generally greatest during summer but still frequent and significant in winter. Snowfall, which normally occurs from November to April, averages 51.1 inches (130 cm) per season, significantly less than areas to the west such as Grand Rapids as Lansing is relatively immune to lake-effect snows; seasonal snowfall has historically ranged from 16.6 in (42 cm) in 1863−64 to 97.2 in (247 cm) in 1880−81. The highest and lowest officially recorded temperatures were 103 °F (39 °C) on July 6, 2012, and −37 °F (−38 °C) on February 2, 1868, with the last −20 °F (−29 °C) or colder reading occurred on February 27, 1994; the record low maximum is −4 °F (−20 °C) on January 22, 1883, while, conversely, the record high minimum is 78 °F (26 °C) on August 1, 2006, and July 18, 1942. Freezing temperatures in June are exceedingly rare and have not occurred in July or August since the 19th century; on average, they arrive on October 4 and depart on May 7, allowing a growing season of 149 days. The average window for measurable snow (≥0.1 in or 0.25 cm) is November 4 through April 6.

Climate data for Lansing, Michigan (Capital Region Int'l), 1991−2020 normals, extremes 1863−present (Note: Official records for Lansing were kept in East Lansing from April 1863 to April 1948, Capital Region Int'l from May 1948 to July 1954, East Lansing again from August 1954 to April 1959, and again at Capital Region Int'l since May 1959. For more information, see ThreadEx.)
Month	Jan	Feb	Mar	Apr	May	Jun	Jul	Aug	Sep	Oct	Nov	Dec	Year
Record high °F (°C)	66 (19)	73 (23)	86 (30)	88 (31)	96 (36)	99 (37)	103 (39)	102 (39)	99 (37)	90 (32)	79 (26)	70 (21)	103 (39)
Mean maximum °F (°C)	51.7 (10.9)	52.6 (11.4)	68.2 (20.1)	78.2 (25.7)	85.4 (29.7)	91.4 (33.0)	92.3 (33.5)	91.3 (32.9)	87.8 (31.0)	79.1 (26.2)	65.4 (18.6)	54.4 (12.4)	94.3 (34.6)
Mean daily maximum °F (°C)	30.6 (−0.8)	33.5 (0.8)	44.4 (6.9)	57.6 (14.2)	69.4 (20.8)	78.9 (26.1)	82.8 (28.2)	80.6 (27.0)	73.6 (23.1)	60.5 (15.8)	47.0 (8.3)	35.7 (2.1)	57.9 (14.4)
Daily mean °F (°C)	23.9 (−4.5)	25.9 (−3.4)	35.2 (1.8)	47.0 (8.3)	58.4 (14.7)	68.0 (20.0)	71.8 (22.1)	70.0 (21.1)	62.5 (16.9)	50.8 (10.4)	39.5 (4.2)	29.5 (−1.4)	48.5 (9.2)
Mean daily minimum °F (°C)	17.2 (−8.2)	18.3 (−7.6)	26.0 (−3.3)	36.4 (2.4)	47.5 (8.6)	57.1 (13.9)	60.9 (16.1)	59.5 (15.3)	51.5 (10.8)	41.2 (5.1)	31.9 (−0.1)	23.3 (−4.8)	39.2 (4.0)
Mean minimum °F (°C)	−5.6 (−20.9)	−3.0 (−19.4)	5.3 (−14.8)	21.0 (−6.1)	31.2 (−0.4)	41.5 (5.3)	47.5 (8.6)	45.7 (7.6)	36.0 (2.2)	26.0 (−3.3)	15.9 (−8.9)	3.9 (−15.6)	−9.4 (−23.0)
Record low °F (°C)	−29 (−34)	−37 (−38)	−25 (−32)	−6 (−21)	19 (−7)	27 (−3)	31 (−1)	26 (−3)	19 (−7)	10 (−12)	−5 (−21)	−25 (−32)	−37 (−38)
Average precipitation inches (mm)	2.06 (52)	1.71 (43)	2.13 (54)	3.26 (83)	3.66 (93)	3.76 (96)	2.94 (75)	3.48 (88)	2.81 (71)	3.16 (80)	2.46 (62)	1.90 (48)	33.33 (847)
Average snowfall inches (cm)	14.3 (36)	12.9 (33)	5.9 (15)	1.7 (4.3)	0.0 (0.0)	0.0 (0.0)	0.0 (0.0)	0.0 (0.0)	0.0 (0.0)	0.2 (0.51)	3.9 (9.9)	11.3 (29)	50.2 (128)
Average extreme snow depth inches (cm)	8.0 (20)	7.6 (19)	5.0 (13)	1.1 (2.8)	0.0 (0.0)	0.0 (0.0)	0.0 (0.0)	0.0 (0.0)	0.0 (0.0)	0.0 (0.0)	2.5 (6.4)	5.4 (14)	10.3 (26)
Average precipitation days (≥ 0.01 in)	13.9	10.7	10.9	12.5	12.5	10.5	9.1	10.1	10.1	11.6	12.3	13.5	137.7
Average snowy days (≥ 0.1 in)	11.9	10.0	4.8	1.9	0.0	0.0	0.0	0.0	0.0	0.2	3.9	9.4	42.1
Average relative humidity (%)	78.8	76.2	73.3	67.6	66.7	69.0	71.0	74.9	77.5	76.1	78.6	81.1	74.2
Average dew point °F (°C)	16.0 (−8.9)	16.9 (−8.4)	25.3 (−3.7)	34.5 (1.4)	45.1 (7.3)	55.2 (12.9)	60.3 (15.7)	59.5 (15.3)	53.2 (11.8)	41.5 (5.3)	32.2 (0.1)	21.7 (−5.7)	38.4 (3.6)
Mean monthly sunshine hours	118.2	140.1	187.6	218.7	278.6	296.2	318.5	278.1	217.6	163.8	92.4	82.1	2,391.9
Percentage possible sunshine	40	47	51	54	61	65	69	65	58	48	32	29	54
Source: NOAA (relative humidity, dew point and sun 1961−1990)

== Demographics ==
Historical population
Census	Pop.	Note	%±
1850	1,229		—
1860	3,074		150.1%
1870	5,241		70.5%
1880	8,319		58.7%
1890	13,102		57.5%
1900	16,485		25.8%
1910	31,229		89.4%
1920	57,327		83.6%
1930	78,397		36.8%
1940	78,753		0.5%
1950	92,129		17.0%
1960	107,807		17.0%
1970	131,403		21.9%
1980	130,414		−0.8%
1990	127,321		−2.4%
2000	119,128		−6.4%
2010	114,297		−4.1%
2020	112,644		−1.4%
2025 (est.)	113,884		1.1%
U.S. Decennial Census

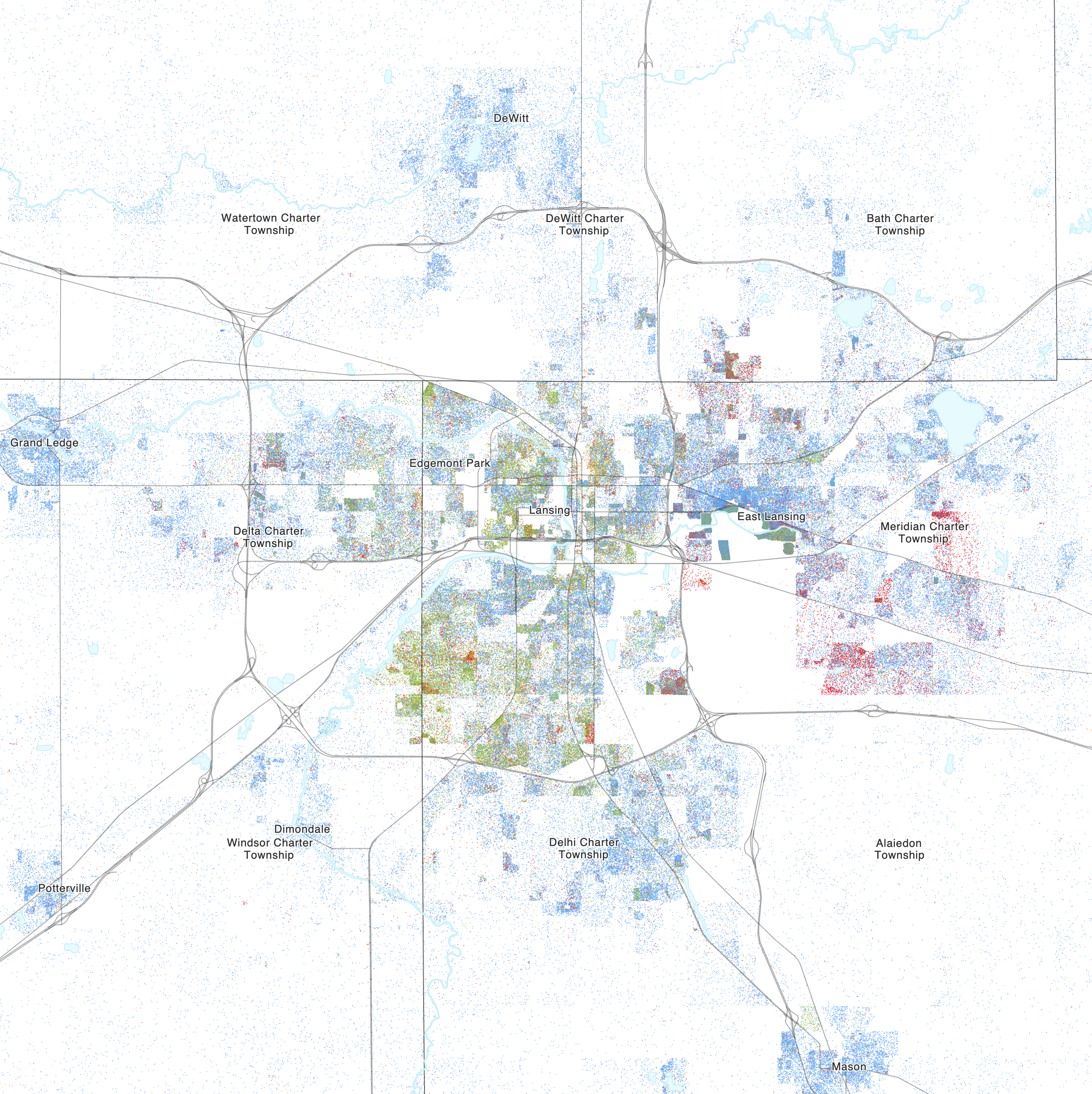
Map of racial distribution in Lansing, 2020 U.S. census. Each dot is one person: ⬤ White ⬤ Black ⬤ Asian ⬤ Hispanic ⬤ Multiracial ⬤ Native American/Other

=== 2020 census ===
Lansing, Michigan – Racial and ethnic composition Note: the US Census treats Hispanic/Latino as an ethnic category. This table excludes Latinos from the racial categories and assigns them to a separate category. Hispanics/Latinos may be of any race.
Race / Ethnicity (NH = Non-Hispanic)	Pop 2000	Pop 2010	Pop 2020	% 2000	% 2010	% 2020
White alone (NH)	73,105	63,381	57,838	61.37%	55.45%	51.35%
Black or African American alone (NH)	25,498	26,194	25,376	21.40%	22.92%	22.53%
Native American or Alaska Native alone (NH)	831	681	504	0.70%	0.60%	0.45%
Asian alone (NH)	3,317	4,202	4,732	2.78%	3.68%	4.20%
Native Hawaiian or Pacific Islander alone (NH)	44	38	32	0.04%	0.03%	0.03%
Other race alone (NH)	270	214	767	0.23%	0.19%	0.68%
Mixed race or Multiracial (NH)	4,177	5,295	7,928	3.51%	4.63%	7.04%
Hispanic or Latino (any race)	11,886	14,292	15,467	9.98%	12.50%	13.73%
Total	119,128	114,297	112,644	100.00%	100.00%	100.00%

=== 2010 census ===
As of the 2010 census, there were 114,297 people, 48,450 households, and 26,234 families residing in the city. The population density was 3,174.9 inhabitants per square mile (1,225.8/km^{2}). There were 54,181 housing units at an average density of 1,505.0 per square mile (581.1/km^{2}). The racial makeup of the city was 61.2% White (55.5% non-Hispanic White), 23.7% African American, 0.8% Native American, 3.7% Asian, 0.04% Pacific Islander, 4.3% from other races, and 6.2% from two or more races. Hispanic or Latino of any race were 12.5% of the population. Foreign-born residents made up 8.3% of the population.

The median age in the city was 32.2 years. 24.2% of residents were under the age of 18; 12.3% were between the ages of 18 and 24; 30.2% were from 25 to 44; 23.8% were from 45 to 64; and 9.7% were 65 years of age or older. The gender makeup of the city was 48.4% male and 51.6% female.

=== 2000 census ===
As of the 2000 census, there were 119,128 people, 49,505 households, and 28,366 families residing in the city. The population density was 3,399.0 inhabitants per square mile (1,312.4/km^{2}). There were 53,159 housing units at an average density of 1,516.8 per square mile (585.6/km^{2}). The racial makeup of the city was 65.28% White (61.4% non-Hispanic White), 21.91% African American, 0.80% Native American, 2.83% Asian, 0.05% Pacific Islander, 4.54% from other races, and 4.60% from two or more races. Hispanic or Latino of any race were 10.0% of the population. The city's foreign-born population stood at 5.9%.

As of 2000, the city's population rose by 32,293 (27%) to 151,421 during the day due to the influx of workers.

There were 49,505 households, out of which 30.0% had children under the age of 18 living with them, 35.8% were married couples living together, 17.0% had a female householder with no husband present, and 42.7% were non-families. 33.2% of all households were made up of individuals, and 8.1% had someone living alone who was 65 years of age or older. The average household size was 2.39 and the average family size was 3.08.

In the city, the population was spread out, with 26.8% under the age of 18, 11.4% from 18 to 24, 32.7% from 25 to 44, 19.3% from 45 to 64, and 9.7% who were 65 years of age or older. The median age was 31 years. For every 100 females, there were 92.3 males. For every 100 females age 18 and over, there were 87.9 males.

The median income for a household in the city was $34,833, and the median income for a family was $41,283. Males had a median income of $32,648 versus $27,051 for females. The per capita income for the city was $17,924. About 13.2% of families and 16.9% of the population were below the poverty line, including 23.2% of those under age 18 and 9.0% of those age 65 or over.

=== Immigration and refugee resettlement ===
The Brookings Institution has ranked Greater Lansing among the top 10 "medium-sized metropolitan areas" in the United States for refugee resettlement, with 5,369 refugees resettled from 1983 to 2004. St. Vincent Catholic Charities and Lutheran Social Services handle the adult and unaccompanied minor resettlement processes, respectively, while other organizations, such as the Refugee Development Center, focus on providing educational and social support services to refugees in the Lansing area. Nearby Michigan State University provides a source of volunteers for many of these programs.

As of 2005, the Lansing area has about 2,000 Arab Americans, mostly second-generation Christian Lebanese Americans as well as some Palestinian Americans.

The city is also home to a large number of temporary foreign residents enrolled as international students at Lansing Community College and nearby Michigan State University, with the city's visitors bureau specifically promoting Mandarin-language video tours of Lansing, touting the "more than 6,000" Chinese students enrolled at MSU. The Lansing School District offers language immersion programs for its students in both Spanish and Chinese.

== Economy ==
Top City Employers in 2018; Source: Lansing Economic Area Partnership
Rank	Company/Organization	#
1	State of Michigan	14,390
2	Michigan State University	10,253
3	University of Michigan Health - Sparrow	7,600
4	General Motors	4,549
5	Lansing Community College	3,144
6	McLaren Greater Lansing	3,000
7	Auto-Owners Insurance	2,578
8	Peckham	2,510
9	Jackson National Life	2,500
10	Dart Container	2,000
11	Meijer	1,500
12	Dean Transportation	800
13	Delta Dental	800
14	MSU Federal Credit Union	800
15	Michigan Farm Bureau	750

The Lansing metropolitan area's major industries are government, education, insurance, healthcare, and automobile manufacturing. Being the state capital, many state government workers reside in the area.

Michigan State University, Thomas M. Cooley Law School, and Lansing Community College are significant employers in the region.

General Motors has offices and a hi-tech manufacturing facility in Lansing and several manufacturing facilities immediately outside the city, as well, in nearby Lansing and Delta townships. The Lansing area is headquarters to four major national insurance companies: Auto-Owners Insurance Company, Jackson National Life, the Accident Fund, and Michigan Millers Insurance Company. Other insurers based in Lansing include Farm Bureau Insurance of Michigan.

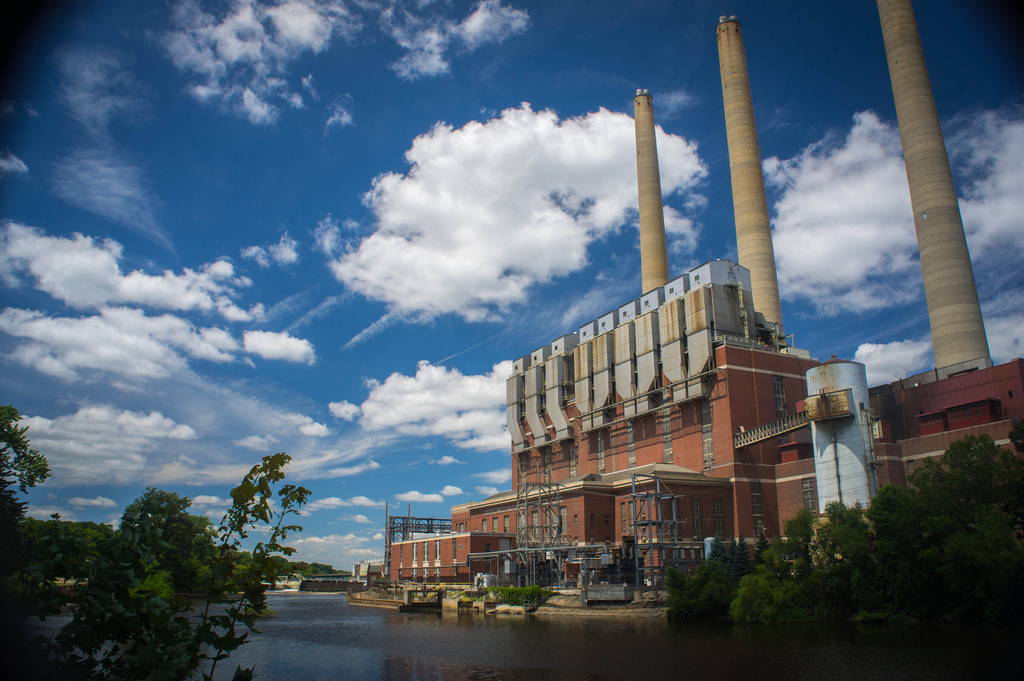
The Otto E. Eckert power plant along the Grand River, operated by the Lansing Board of Water and Light

Locally owned and operated convenience store chain Quality Dairy is a significant presence in the Lansing market. The first Quality Dairy Store opened in 1936 and as of 2023 there are 26 retail locations in the Mid-Michigan area. Quality Dairy Company's headquarters is located near REO Town in Lansing and operates its Dairy Plant and Bakery Plant from central Lansing as well.

The recent decline of the auto industry in the region has increased the region's awareness of the importance of a strategy to foster the high-technology sector. An LG Energy Solution battery factory made a $4.3 billion agreement in 2026 to supply lithium iron phosphate battery cells for grid batteries from 2027 to 2030.

Early availability of high-speed Internet in 1996, as well as the MSU, Cooley Law School, and Lansing Community College student body population, fostered an intellectual environment for information technology companies to incubate. Lansing has a number of technology companies in the fields of information technology and biotechnology.

=== Healthcare ===
University of Michigan Health - Sparrow Lansing is a 740-bed hospital affiliated with Michigan State University and its College of Human Medicine and College of Osteopathic Medicine. It offers a Level I Trauma Center and its own helicopter service.

McLaren–Greater Lansing Hospital enjoys a special affiliation in adiation oncology with the University of Michigan and Michigan State University; McLaren–Greater Lansing is part of the Great Lakes Cancer Institute (GLCI).

=== Urban renewal and downtown redevelopment ===
Several urban renewal projects by private developers are adding higher end apartments and condominiums to the Lansing market. The Arbaugh, a former department store across from Cooley Law School, was converted into apartments in 2005. Motor Wheel Lofts, a former industrial site, was converted into loft-style living spaces in mid-2006. A combination retail and residential complex immediately south of Cooley Law School Stadium (formerly Oldsmobile Park) called "The Stadium District", was completed in 2007. The Stadium District was redeveloped using a grant from the Michigan State Housing Development Authority through the Cool Cities Initiative.

In May 2006 the historically significant Mutual Building located on Capitol Avenue was purchased by The Christman Company to be renovated back to its original grandeur and used as the company's headquarters. Additional downtown developments include the renovation of the historic Hollister Building and the expansion of the former Abrams Aerial Building. As of August 2008, an 18-story condominium high-rise called Capitol Club Tower was in the design phase with the adjacent parking structure having been approved by city council and purchased by the developer. The city market, in existence since 1909, was approved to be sold for a multi-building mixed-use development called MarketPlace, right next to the current market on the adjacent riverfront. The MarketPlace project was redeveloped along with BallPark North, another mixed-use development that will be immediately north of Oldsmobile Stadium. A new city market was built north of the Lansing Center, but closed in 2019. Across the river, the Accident Fund Insurance Company renovated the former (art deco) Ottawa Street Powerplant into their new headquarters. In addition to the renovation, Accident Fund Insurance Company built a modern addition to the north of the historic portion that is connected by an atrium for more office space, as well as a parking structure. In 2009, the restaurant Troppo began construction on a new 2-story building that will have an open-air patio on the roof facing the Capitol building. Developer Eyde Co. announced plans on April 6, 2010, to renovate the historical and prominent Knapp's building in downtown Lansing for first floor retail, office space and apartments/condos on the top floor (5th) in a $22–24 million project.

=== Retail ===
The Lansing area has two major enclosed shopping malls: Lansing Mall and Meridian Mall. Other major retail centers include Eastwood Towne Center, Frandor Shopping Center, Delta Crossing and The Marketplace.

== Arts and culture ==
=== Festivals ===
The African American Parade occurs in Lansing's Westside as part of the annual Juneteenth Celebration Each year in August, the Michigan Pride festival includes an LGBT pride parade from Riverfront Park to the capitol. The annual Silver Bells in the City Electric Light Parade proceeds through the streets of downtown Lansing every November, the Friday before Thanksgiving. It is followed by the lighting of Michigan's official Christmas tree in front of the State Capitol and a firework show (weather permitting) over the State Capitol.

=== Music ===
Lansing has a rich musical heritage, highlighted by the Lansing Symphony Orchestra, which has entertained the region since 1929. The city hosts numerous music festivals throughout the year, including the Lansing JazzFest and Old Town BluesFest, which attract leading musicians and large crowds. The Common Ground Music Festival is held over a week every July at the Adado Riverfront Park in downtown Lansing, pulling in crowds over 90,000 for the week.

=== Libraries ===
The Library of Michigan and Historical Center is a state library and research center. The library is one of the top five genealogical research facilities in the United States. The Capital Area District Library has 13 branches within Ingham County, some of these include the Main Library downtown, the Foster Library on the east side, and the South Lansing Library on the south side.

=== Museums ===
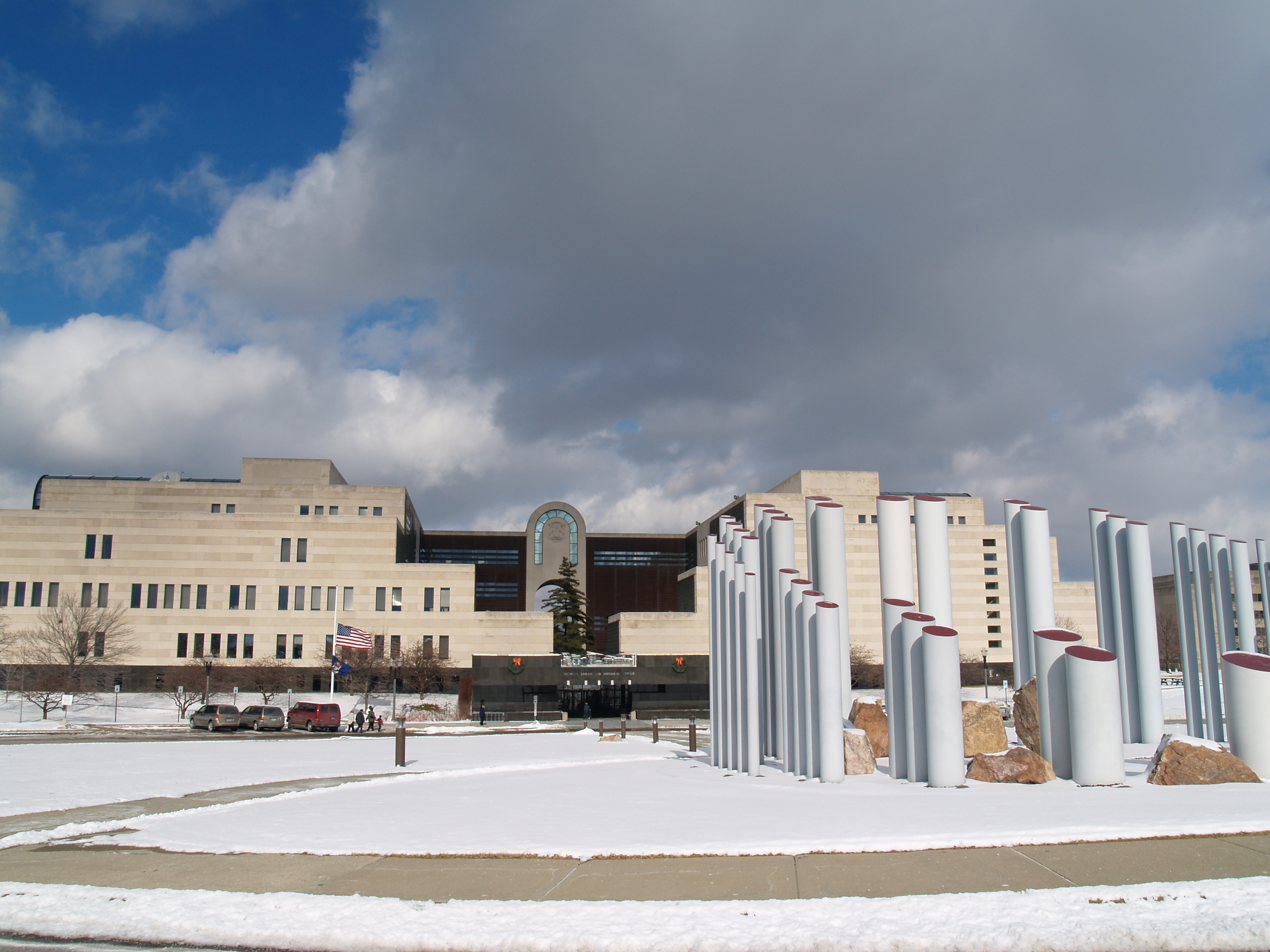
Michigan Library and Historical Center

Lansing is home to a number of small, specialized museums:

- The Impression 5 Science Center is a children's science center located in a historic wagon works factory on the Grand River.
- The Michigan Library and Historical Center contains one of the 10 largest genealogy collections in the nation, has a museum dedicated to Michigan's history among other attractions.
- The Michigan Women's Hall of Fame is a museum dedicated to the historical accomplishments and achievements of Michigan women. The house is located directly south of downtown in the 1903-built Cooley-Haze House. The museum is surrounded by Cooley Gardens.
- The R. E. Olds Transportation Museum is dedicated to the education of Lansing's role in the development of transportation, particularly the automobile.
- The Turner-Dodge House is a museum dedicated to Lansing's early pioneers. The museum sits in the Classical Revival-styled Turner-Dodge Mansion, built in 1858 for James and Marion Turner, and later by their daughter and her husband. It is on the National Register of Historic Places.

=== Theatre ===
The Riverwalk Theatre, (formerly the Okemos Barn Theatre), the Lansing Civic Players, and the now defunct BoarsHead Theater are or were all located in downtown. Peppermint Creek Theatre Company is a well established "new" theater company. Happendance, Michigan's longest-running professional modern dance company, has been based in Greater Lansing since 1976. The Greater Lansing Ballet Company is a ballet and dance company. The Creole Gallery brings in various musicians and hosts the Icarus Falling Theater group.

=== Potter Park Zoo ===
The historic Potter Park Zoo, located along the Red Cedar River in Lansing, is a 102-acre park that has more than 160 species of animals. The park holds numerous programs and events for children and families to enjoy. With annual attendance increasing every year since 2006 (110,167 in 2006, 137,237 in 2008, and 167,000 in 2009) there are $667,100 in capital improvements planned for 2009 including a giant walk-in aviary and a new female tiger. In 2009 the zoo began a $1.4 million renovation to its rhinoceros exhibit. This is in addition to $1.3 million spent on capital improvements in 2008. In 2011 the Black Rhino exhibit opened; and three tiger cubs were born. In 2016 a 3-acre moose exhibit opened in the park.

=== Other area destinations ===
In October 2009 the Wharton Center for Performing Arts completed a 24,000 square feet (2,230 m^{2}), $18.5 million expansion and renovation, having already spent over $1.3 million in 2008. Many Broadway shows come to The Wharton Center before traveling to theaters in larger places such as Chicago. The Kresge Art Museum, the MSU Museum, and the Abrams Planetarium are highly acclaimed cultural destinations located on the campus of Michigan State University in East Lansing. In June 2007 MSU announced the plans to build a new art museum after a $26 million gift from Eli and Edythe Broad. Internationally known Pritzker Prize winning architect Zaha Hadid of London won the design competition for the East Lansing museum that was completed in November 2012.

== Sports ==
Club	Sport	League	Venue	Years of Existence
Lansing Lugnuts	Baseball	Midwest League	Jackson Field	1996–present
Michigan State Spartans	College athletics	Big Ten Conference	Various Stadiums
Lansing Community College	College athletics	Michigan Community College Athletic Association
Lansing Roller Derby	Roller derby	Women's Flat Track Derby Association	Lansing Center
Lansing Common FC	Soccer	Midwest Premier League	Eastern Stadium	2020–present

The Lansing Lugnuts are a Midwest League, Minor League Baseball team, currently affiliated with the Athletics. The team plays its home games at Jackson Field, which was built at a cost of $12.7 million and opened in 1996 in downtown Lansing. It was partially renovated in 2006. Jackson Field has a seating capacity of 11,215 fans, and was built to accommodate additional expansion. Previously known as Oldsmobile Park, the facility was renamed Thomas M. Cooley Law School Stadium in April 2010, in reference to the park's new sponsor. It was renamed again to Jackson Field after a change in sponsorship to Jackson National Life.

Michigan State University, located in East Lansing, is the largest university in the State of Michigan. MSU sponsors both men's and women's sports, usually competing as a member of the Big Ten Conference. The Spartans have won National Titles in Men's Basketball, Football, Men's Boxing, Men's Cross Country, Men's Gymnastics, Men's Ice Hockey, Men's Soccer, and Men's Wrestling. Lansing Community College also sponsors many sports, competing as members of the Michigan Community College Athletic Association. The Stars have won NJCAA titles in the following sports: Women's Softball, Men's Basketball, Women's Basketball, Men's Cross Country, Women's Cross Country, Women's Marathon and Men's Marathon.

The Lansing area is also known for its many golf courses, with two courses owned by Michigan State University, four municipal courses, and many additional public and private courses in the area. The former Walnut Hills Country Club in nearby East Lansing formerly hosted the LPGA's Oldsmobile Classic from 1992 to 2000. The Michigan PGA recently relocated from the Detroit area to Bath, Michigan, which is on the northern edge of Lansing.

Other past sports teams include the Lansing Lancers (International Hockey League – 1974–1975), Lansing United (USL PDL – 2014–2018), Lansing Ignite (USL League One – 2018–2019) and Lansing Sting (American Basketball Association – 2013–2014).

== Government ==
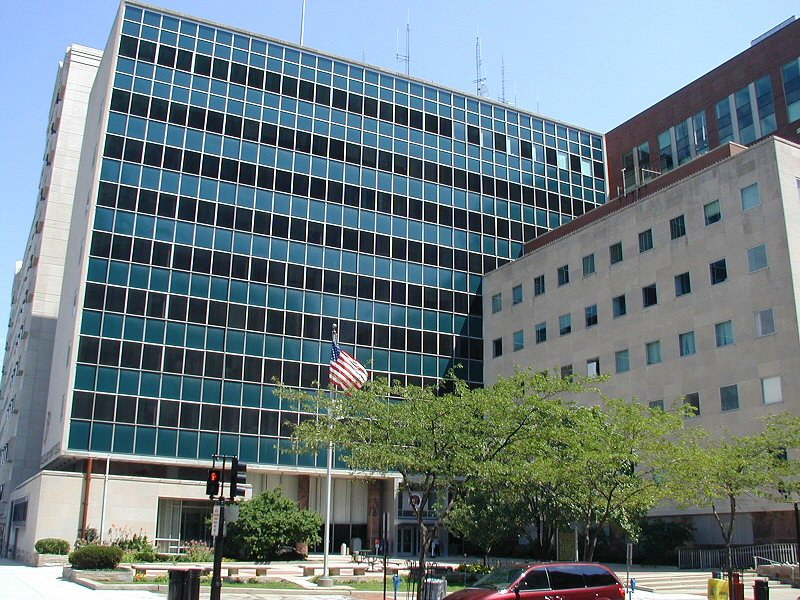
Lansing City Hall & Lansing Police Department Central Precinct

Lansing is administered under a mayor–council government, more specifically a strong mayor form in which the mayor is the city's chief executive officer. The mayor is obligated to appoint department heads and draft and administer a city budget among other responsibilities. The mayor may also veto legislation from council, though the veto can be overridden by an affirmative vote of two-thirds of the council. The mayor and city clerk are elected at-large every four years.

The city council is the legislative body of the city and consists of eight members. Four members are elected from four single-member districts using the first-past-the-post method in the city's wards, and four members are elected at-large using the block voting method. Members of the council serve staggered four-year terms. Half the council is up for election every two years, including two ward seats and two at-large seats. At its first meeting of the year, the council chooses from amongst its members a president and vice president. The president is the council's presiding officer, and also chooses the chairs of council committees. In the absence of the president and vice president, the city clerk chairs the council.

The city largely supports the Democratic Party. It has not had a Republican mayor in office since 1993 when then-Democratic state representative David Hollister defeated incumbent Mayor Jim Crawford, who had formerly served as a Republican member on the Ingham County Board of Commissioners. However, all city elections are held on an officially nonpartisan basis.

Since given the ability to do so by the state in 1964, the city has levied an income tax of 1 percent on residents. 0.5 percent on non-residents, and 1.0 percent on corporations.

=== State and federal representation ===
Since the 2022 redistricting cycle, Lansing is part of Michigan's 7th congressional district, which is represented by Republican Tom Barrett. At the state level, Lansing is located in Michigan's 21st Senate district, represented by Democrat Sarah Anthony, and Michigan's 28th Senate district, represented by Democrat Sam Singh. The city lies in the 73rd, 74th, 75th, 76th and 77th districts of the Michigan State House of Representatives, represented by state representatives Julie Brixie, Kara Hope, Penelope Tsernoglou, Angela Witwer and Emily Dievendorf, all Democrats.

Though Lansing is not the designated county seat, some Ingham County offices are located in downtown Lansing, including a branch office of the county clerk, the county personnel office, and some courtrooms.

== Education ==
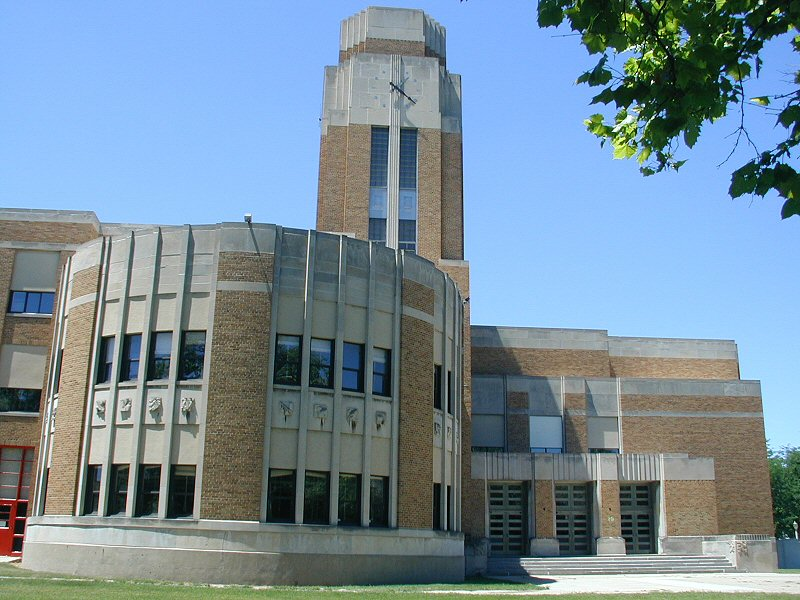
J.W. Sexton High School, Westside Lansing

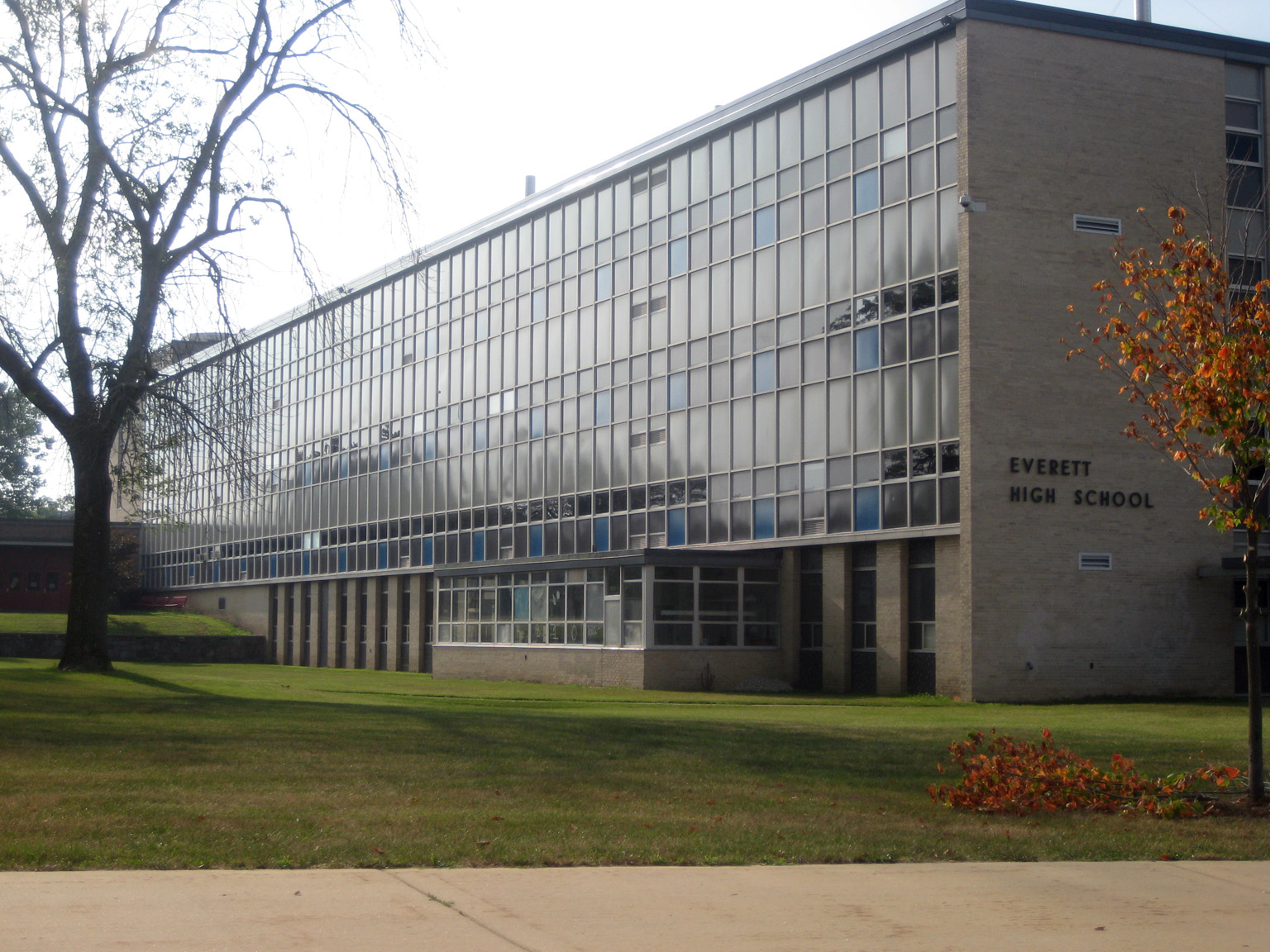
Everett High School, Southside Lansing

Michigan State University is known as "the pioneer land grant college" and located in neighboring East Lansing. MSU has one of the largest land campuses in the United States and is home to several nationally and internationally recognized academic and research-oriented programs. Michigan State offers over 200 programs of study and is home to fourteen different degree-granting schools and colleges including two medical schools, a veterinary school, a law school, and numerous PhD programs.

Lansing Community College offers more than 500 areas of study to over 18,000 students at its main facilities in Lansing, and another 5,000 students at twenty-nine extension centers and a site in Otsu, Japan. The University Center stands on the former site of "Old Central", Lansing's first public high school, which was established in 1875 as Lansing High School. Other institutions of higher education include Western Michigan University (branch campus in Delta Township), Davenport University in Downtown Lansing, Central Michigan University (branch campus), and Great Lakes Christian College (campus in Delta Township).

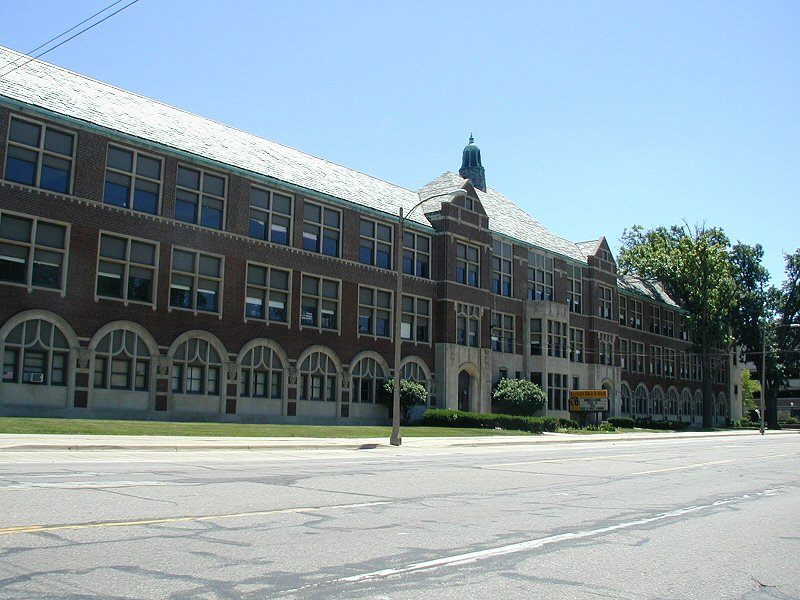
Eastern High School, Eastside Lansing

Within Ingham County, most of Lansing is in Lansing School District. Some portions are in East Lansing Public Schools, Holt Public Schools, Mason Public Schools, Okemos Public Schools, and Waverly Community Schools. Within Clinton County, school districts which include parts of Lansing are Lansing School District and DeWitt Public Schools. In Eaton County, school districts serving parts of Lansing include Lansing School District, Holt Public Schools, and Grand Ledge Public Schools.

Public schools

- Lansing School District
  - Lansing Eastern High School
  - Lansing Everett High School
  - J. W. Sexton High School
- Grand Ledge Public Schools
- Ingham Intermediate School District
  - Ingham Academy High School
- Waverly School District

Charter schools

- Mid-Michigan Public School Academy
- El-Hajj Malik El-Shabazz Academy (named after Malcolm X) (closed)
- Sankofa Shule (closed)

Private schools

- Capitol City Baptist School
- Emanuel Lutheran School
- Lansing Catholic High School
- Lansing Christian Schools
- New Covenant Christian School
- Our Savior Lutheran School

== Media ==
=== Newspapers and magazines ===
- Lansing State Journal
- City Pulse
- The New Citizens Press
- Capital Gains Media
- Capital Area Women's Lifestyle Magazine
- The Greater Lansing Business Monthly
- Greater Lansing Woman Magazine
- The Hub
- MIRS News-Michigan Information & Research Service
- The State News
- Gongwer News Service
- The Michigan Bulletin
- Patient In Charge Magazine

=== Television ===
Cable slots listed reflect the Comcast cable system in Lansing.

- WLNS 6 (CBS) (Cable 9)
- WILX 10 (NBC) (Cable 4)
- WKAR 23 (PBS) (Cable 13) / DT2 (World) (Cable 20) / DT3 (Create) (Cable 18) / DT4 (PBS Kids) (Cable 293)
- WSYM 47 (Fox) (Cable 7)
- WLAJ 53 (ABC) (Cable 3) / DT2 (The CW) (Cable 5)

=== Radio ===
Note: If the station has no city listed before the format, it is licensed to Lansing.

- 88.1 WLGH – (Leroy Township, contemporary Christian) "Smile FM"
- 88.5 WJOM – (Eagle, contemporary Christian) "Smile FM"
- 88.9 WDBM – (East Lansing, college/Michigan State University) "The Impact"
- 89.7 WLNZ – (public radio/Lansing Community College)
- 90.5 WKAR – (East Lansing, public radio/Michigan State University)
  - Note: WKAR has an effective radiated power of 86,000 watts
- 91.3 WOES – (Ovid, polka/Ovid-Elsie High School)
- 92.1 WQTX – (St. Johns, Classic Hip Hop/R&B) "The Hits That Power the Party...Stacks 92.1"
- 92.9 WLMI – (Grand Ledge, Classic Hits radio) "Lansing's Greatest Hits"
- 93.7 WBCT-FM – (Grand Rapids, country) "B93"
  - Note: WBCT has an effective radiated power 320,000 watts
- 94.1 WWDK – (Jackson, Classic Country) "94.1 Duke FM"
- 94.9 WMMQ – (East Lansing, classic rock)
- 96.5 WQHH – (DeWitt, urban) "Power 96.5"
- 97.5 WJIM – (CHR) "97-5 Now-FM"
- 99.1 WFMK – (East Lansing, adult contemporary)
- 99.9 W260BX - (religious/southern gospel) "Family Life Radio"
  - Rebroadcasts WUNN 1110 AM.
- 100.7 WITL-FM – (country) "Whittle"
- 101.7 WHZZ – (adult hits) "Mike-FM"
- 105.7 WSRW – (Grand Rapids, adult contemporary) "Star 105.7"
- 106.1 WJXQ – (Charlotte, active rock) "Q106"
- 107.3 WTNR – (Greenville/Grand Rapids, Country)
- 730 AM WVFN – (East Lansing, sports talk) "The Game"
- 870 AM WKAR – (East Lansing, NPR news/talk)
- 1110 AM WUNN – (Mason, religious/southern gospel) "Family Life Radio"
- 1180 AM WXLA – Dimondale, (adult standards) "Timeless Classics 1180"
- 1240 AM WJIM – (news/talk) "Lansing's Big Talker"
- 1320 AM WILS – (news/talk) "More Compelling Talk Radio"
- 1390 AM WLCM – (Charlotte, religious)
- 1580 AM WWSJ – (St. Johns, urban contemporary gospel) "Joy 1580"
- 162.400 WXK81 – NOAA Weather Radio (Onondaga, weather)

Radio stations from Ann Arbor, Grand Rapids, Kalamazoo, Saginaw, and Flint can also be heard in the Lansing area.

== Infrastructure ==
=== Transportation ===
==== Airports ====
Scheduled commercial airline service is offered from Capital Region International Airport (formerly known as Capital City Airport). Delta Air Lines maintains a route to Detroit, while American Airlines offers non-stop flights to both Chicago O'Hare and Washington, D.C. Apple Vacations provides seasonal flights to Cancún, Mexico; Montego Bay, Jamaica; and Punta Cana, Dominican Republic. UPS has a freight hub at Capital Region International Airport making up part of the 42 million pounds of annual cargo moving through the airport. In 2008 the airport received a port of entry designation – known as Port Lansing – and now has a permanent customs facility, thus changing its name to reflect the port of entry status. The same year a 500-foot (150 m) extension to the largest of the three runways – now 8,506-foot (2,593 m) – was completed to allow for larger aircraft to use the airport.

==== Major highways ====
- I-69 runs from Indianapolis north to Lansing and east to Flint and Port Huron, connecting to Canada.
- I-96 runs from Muskegon, past Grand Rapids and Lansing, to Detroit.
- I-496 loops through downtown Lansing, connecting with I-96 on either end.
- BL I-69 is a loop route running through Lansing and East Lansing.
- BL I-96 is a loop route running through Lansing.
- US 127 is a north–south highway passing between the city and neighboring East Lansing, continuing northerly toward Clare and Grayling and southerly toward Jackson, Michigan, and into Ohio.
- M-43 (Saginaw Street/Grand River Avenue)
- M-99 (Martin Luther King Jr. Boulevard)

==== Railways ====
Amtrak provides intercity passenger rail service at a stop in nearby East Lansing, on the Blue Water line from Chicago to Port Huron. Three freight railroads serve Lansing, including Canadian National Railway, CSX Transportation, and the Jackson & Lansing Railroad.

==== Public transportation ====
Capital Area Transportation Authority (CATA) provides public transit bus service to the Lansing-East Lansing Metropolitan area on 33 routes. CATA boasts the second highest ridership in Michigan at 9,634,900 in 2024. Greyhound Lines provides intercity bus service. CATA and Greyhound are both located in the CATA Transportation Center in downtown Lansing. Several taxicab companies serve the area. The Michigan Flyer provides bus service between Lansing and Detroit Metropolitan Wayne County Airport 12 times daily, with a stop in Ann Arbor along the way.

==== Bicycling ====
The 20-mile (32 km), non-motorized Lansing River Trail runs along the Grand River and the Red Cedar River. It extends as far east as Michigan State University, passing Potter Park Zoo, the Capitol Loop, and several other destinations of interest, and runs as far west as Moores Park. The trail can be reached using many dedicated access points, including eight with parking lots nearby. The trail's breadth is extended from time to time. Currently, the trailheads are: North – Dietrich Park; East – Kircher Park; South – Maguire Park; West – Moores Park. All segments are hard-surfaced. The River Trail connects to other pathways/trails in the Lansing-metro area: East – Michigan State University path system; South – Sycamore Trail. Since the trail follows a river, most street crossings use platforms under existing street bridges to provide an uncommon amount of grade separation.

=== Utilities ===
Water supply, power and steam are municipally owned utilities which are provided by Lansing Board of Water & Light. In 2008 the Lansing BWL constructed Michigan's largest solar array towards the goal of increasing renewable energy in the energy grid. Natural gas is provided by Consumers Energy.

== Notable people ==
- Joel Bakan, Canadian law professor and documentary filmmaker
- Ray Stannard Baker, journalist and author
- L. Anna Ballard, first female medical physician in Lansing, Michigan
- Ricky Berry, NBA player for Sacramento Kings
- Lingg Brewer, politician and educator
- Terry Brunk, ex-WWE, ECW, TNA/WCW professional wrestler known as "Sabu"
- Timothy Busfield, actor and director, thirtysomething, Field of Dreams, The West Wing
- Charles G. Callard, co-founder of Callard Madden & Associates and a pioneer developer of corporate valuation models
- Candi Carpenter, country singer & songwriter
- Jim Cash, screenwriter of Top Gun and other commercially successful films
- Carolyn Cassady, writer, wife of Beat Generation icon Neal Cassady
- Ian Conyers, former member of the Michigan State Senate
- Alva M. Cummins, lawyer and 1922 Democratic nominee for Governor of Michigan
- Doc Corbin Dart, singer of punk band The Crucifucks
- DJ Infamous, hip-hop DJ
- Tony Earl, former Governor of Wisconsin
- Ed Emshwiller, visual artist and founder of CalArts computer animation Lab
- Emeka Eneli, soccer player
- Rashad Evans, UFC fighter
- David Fairchild, botanist
- Ed Farhat, professional wrestler known as "The Sheik"
- Jonathan Farwell, actor
- Bryn Forbes, NBA basketball player
- Chris Hansen, Dateline NBC correspondent
- Thom Hartmann, radio talk-show host and author
- Ahney Her, actress, Gran Torino
- Joel Higgins, actor, graduated from Michigan State
- Andy Hilbert, NHL hockey player
- Keiffer Hubbell, figure skater
- Madison Hubbell, figure skater
- Steve Huffman, entrepreneur and web developer, CEO and co-founder of Reddit
- John Hughes, film writer and director, born in Lansing
- Carol Hutchins, softball Hall of Famer
- Kevin Jackson, Olympic gold medalist and two-time World Champion in freestyle wrestling
- Magic Johnson, Michigan State University and NBA basketball star
- Jacquelyn Kelley, All-American Girls Professional Baseball League player
- Mike Kennedy, U.S. representative for Utah
- Michael Kimball, novelist
- Lisa Kron, theatre actress and playwright
- Dave Lanphear, comic book artist
- Lawrence Leathers, jazz drummer
- Matthew Lillard, actor
- Bruce Look, MLB played with the Minnesota Twins
- Dean Look, professional football player and NFL official; also briefly a MLB outfielder with the Chicago White Sox
- Malcolm X, human rights activist
- Jef Mallett, creator and artist of the comic strip Frazz
- Suzanne Malveaux, CNN television news reporter
- Teal Marchande, actress
- Todd Martin, tennis player
- Pop McKale, athlete and coach; University of Arizona arena bears his name
- Drew Miller, NHL hockey player
- Kelly Miller, NHL player
- Kip Miller, NHL player, 1990 recipient of Hobey Baker Memorial Award
- Ryan Miller, NHL and Olympic hockey player
- Muhsin Muhammad, NFL football player
- Needlz, hip-hop and rap producer
- Olivia Nelson-Ododa, WNBA player
- Ransom E. Olds, automobile manufacturer, founded Olds Motor Vehicle Company
- Larry Page, co-founder of Google.com
- DJ Perry, film writer, actor and director, born in Lansing
- Wally Pipp, former Baseball player and member of the New York Yankees
- Alice Pollitt, All-American Girls Professional Baseball League player
- Corey Potter, NHL hockey player
- Merv Pregulman, NFL player for Green Bay Packers, Detroit Lions
- Dan Price, co-founder and CEO of Gravity Payments
- Greg Raymer, 2004 World Series of Poker champion
- Carl Benton Reid, actor
- Paige Renkoski, woman who mysteriously disappeared in 1990
- Burt Reynolds, Oscar-nominated and Golden Globe award-winning actor, born and raised in Lansing
- DiDa Ritz, drag queen
- Vic Saier, MLB player
- Steven Seagal, actor and martial artist, born in Lansing
- Frederic L. Smith, co-founder of General Motors, born in Lansing
- John Smoltz, MLB pitcher, 1996 Cy Young Award winner, Hall of Famer
- Lori Nelson Spielman, author of the bestseller Life List
- Debbie Stabenow, U.S. senator
- Gary Starkweather, inventor of the laser printer
- Billy Strings, guitarist and bluegrass musician
- Marcus Taylor, professional basketball player
- George Teague, NFL player for Green Bay Packers, Dallas Cowboys, Miami Dolphins
- Mark Turcotte, Ojibwe poet and writer
- Denzel Valentine, professional basketball player
- Jay Vincent, professional basketball player
- Sam Vincent, professional basketball player
- Gretchen Whitmer, Governor of Michigan and former Minority Leader of the Michigan State Senate
- Howard Wolpe, Congressman who was a Lansing resident during his term in office.
- Lebbeus Woods, architect
- Morlok Quadruplets, set of quadruplets

== International relations ==
=== Sister cities ===
Lansing's sister cities are:

- Akuapim South District, Eastern Region, Ghana
- Asan, Chungcheongnam-do, South Korea
- Guadalajara, Jalisco, Mexico
- Ōtsu, Shiga, Japan
- Pianezza, Piedmont, Italy
- Saltillo, Coahuila, Mexico
- Sanming, Fujian, China
- Eskişehir, Eskişehir Province, Turkey

Lansing was a sister city of Kubyashi District in Saint Petersburg, Russia. The agreement began in 1992 and ended in practice when a change to the political structure of Saint Petersburg cancelled the district. The relations were officially severed by Lansing in 2013 as a protest of the laws against LGBT rights in Russia.

=== Friendship cities ===
Lansing's friendship cities are:

- Cosenza, Calabria, Italy
- Dar es Salaam, Tanzania
- Huế, Vietnam
- Goris, Syunik Armenia
