= Colonial Village, Lansing, Michigan =

Colonial Village
- Neighborhood
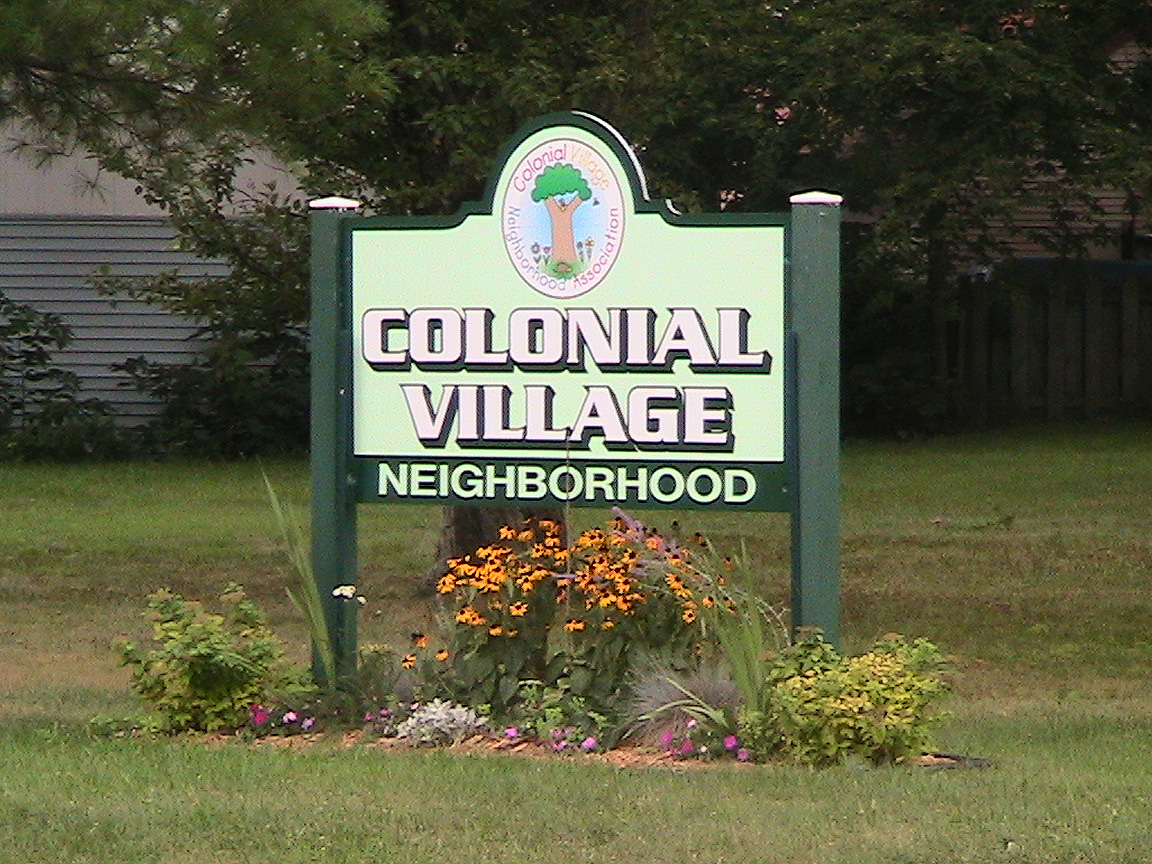
- Colonial Village sign

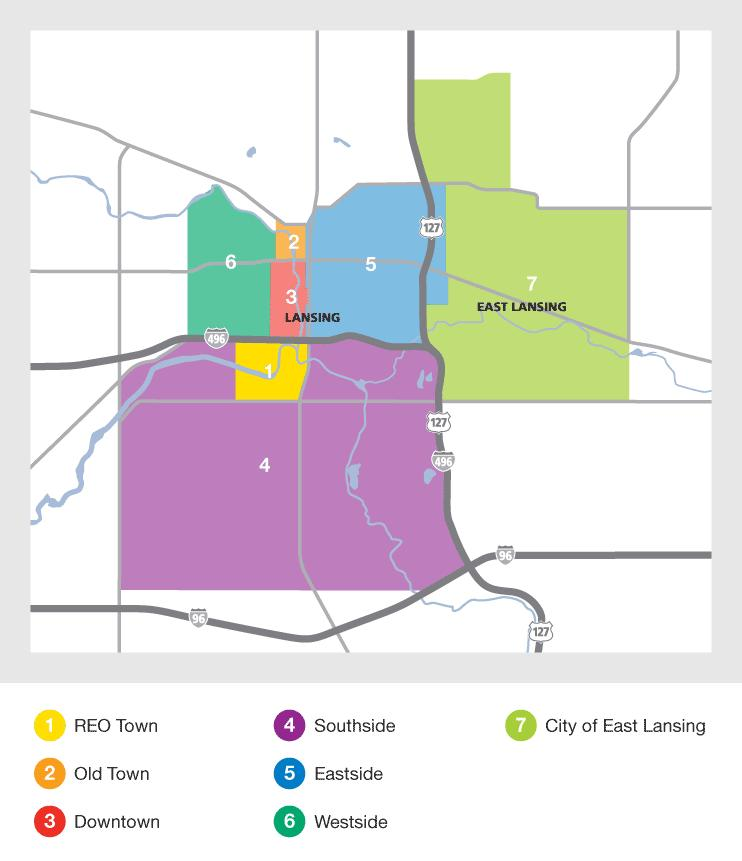
- Location in the state of Michigan
- Coordinates: 42°44′49″N 83°8′35″W
- Country: United States
- State: Michigan
- County: Ingham

Area
  - Total: 0.76 sq mi (2.0 km^{2})
- Elevation: 873 ft (266.1 m)

Population (2010)
  - Total: 1,901
  - Density: 2,481/sq mi (958/km^{2})
- Time zone: UTC-5 (EST)
  - Summer (DST): UTC-4 (EDT)
- ZIP codes: 48910
- Area code: 517
- Website: https://www.cvnanews.com/
- Colonial Village @ city-data.com

Colonial Village is a neighborhood in Lansing, Michigan. It is located southwest of REO Town in the southside of the city.

== Description ==
The neighborhood is bordered by West Mount Hope Avenue to the north, South Martin Luther King Blvd (M-99) to the east, West Holmes Road to the south, and Pleasant Grove Road to the west. Largely composed of single-family homes, there are commercial and retail components along Mount Hope at the Colonial Village Shopping Center, and centered at MLK and Holmes in the southeast corner of the neighborhood at the open-air Logan Square Shopping Center. Directly north of Logan Square, sprawls a heavy industrial area owned by Reid Machinery which lies along a branch of the Jackson & Lansing Railroad which cuts diagonally across the southeastern corner of the district. The neighborhood is also home to two churches, Grace United Methodist Church and LifeWay Community Church (formerly Colonial Village Baptist Church). A USPS Facility is located in the southern section of the neighborhood. Elmhurst Park rests almost directly in the center of the neighborhood, along with Elmhurst School. Holly Park is a small pocket park located in the southern section of the neighborhood, with a few small hiking trails leading to what is now the Lansing Charter Academy.

== History ==
The oldest part of the neighborhood was part of a 1917 annexation of Lansing into the surrounding township. This section is in the northeastern corner of the neighborhood, and is bound by Martin Luther King Boulevard to the east, Victor Avenue to the south, Pattengill Avenue to the west, and Mount Hope Avenue to the north. Subsequent annexations in 1950, 1955, and 1958, respectively, brought the rest of the land into the city that would become the Colonial Village neighborhood.

== Education ==
=== Primary and secondary schools ===
The Lansing School District operates Lewton Elementary on Lewton Plaza, bordering Mt. Hope Avenue, as well as the Lansing K-8 STEM Academy (formerly Dwight Rich Middle School) on Hampden Drive. The district formerly operated Elmhurst Elementary along Pattengill Avenue, though the building now functions as storage and office space for the district. Cole Academy, a K-6 charter school chartered by Central Michigan University, is located along Mt. Hope Avenue.
