= Franklin Avenue Presbyterian Church =

Historic church in Michigan, United States

- U.S. National Register of Historic Places
- Michigan State Historic Site
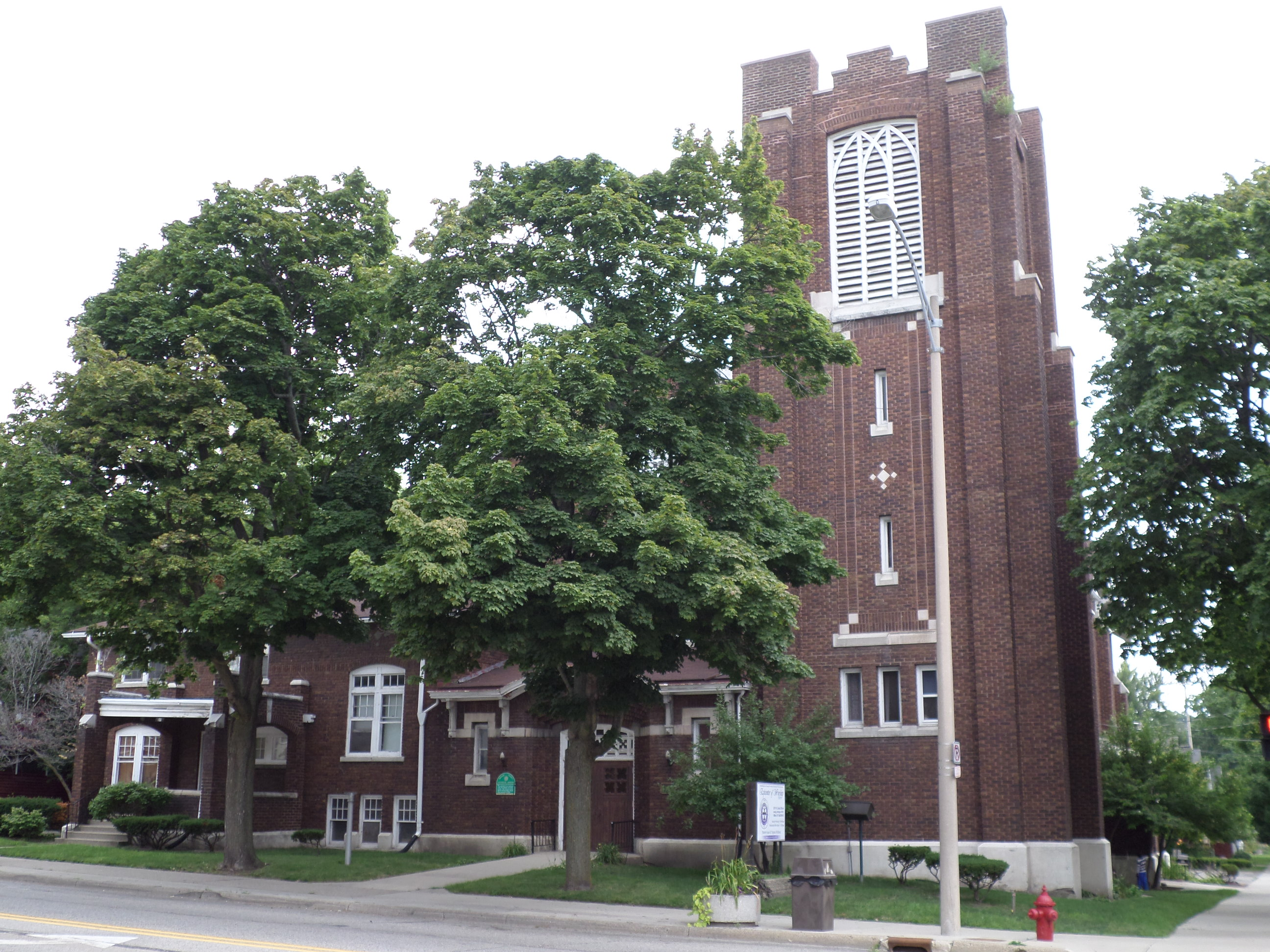
- The church in July 2014

- Location within Michigan Location within the United States
- Interactive map
- Location: 108 W. Grand River Ave., Lansing, Michigan
- Coordinates: 42°44′53″N 84°33′8″W
- Area: 1 acre (0.40 ha)
- Built: 1916
- Architect: Edwyn A. Bowd
- Architectural style: Prairie School, Bungalow/craftsman, Arts and Crafts
- NRHP reference No.: 88000564

Significant dates
- Added to NRHP: May 27, 1988
- Designated MSHS: December 5, 1986

Franklin Avenue Presbyterian Church (also known as North Presbyterian Church) is a historic church at 108 W. Grand River Avenue in Lansing, Michigan. It was built in 1916 and added to the National Register of Historic Places in 1988.

== History ==
In 1863, a daughter congregation of the First Presbyterian Church of Lansing was organized in what is now Old Town. A lot was donated to the congregation along what was then Franklin Avenue (and is now Grand River Avenue). The first church, a brick structure, was consecrated in 1865. By 1910, however, the local population had grown immensely, and the Presbyterian congregation was too large for the original church structure. In 1913, the Reverend Richard Spetnagel, pastor of Franklin Presbyterian, proposed constructing a new building. The congregation hired Lansing architect Edwyn A. Bowd in 1914 to design a new structure. The old church was demolished in 1915, and the new one consecrated in 1916.

In 1935, Franklin Avenue was re-designated Grand River Avenue, and the congregation changed its name to the North Presbyterian Church. In 2010 the congregation merged into Westminster Presbyterian Church due to shrinking attendance, and the building was bought by The Epicenter of Worship Church.

== Description ==
The former Franklin Avenue Presbyterian Church is a rectangular, gable-roof building constructed of dark brown brick, with concrete and wood trim. At one corner of the main facade is a square tower with a louvered belfry. The church has an Arts and Crafts form, with large triangular wood brackets under the eaves and a grid pattern laid into the rose window shape in the front gable. Inside, a stair leads to the second-floor auditorium, which has Akron-plan semi-circular seating facing a corner pulpit. Sunday school rooms are nearby.

A two-story dark brown brick manse with a hip roof is attached to the church on one side. it is connected internally t o the pastor's study in the main church.
