= Michigan State University =

Public university in East Lansing, Michigan, US

- Former name: List: Agricultural College of the State of Michigan (1855–1861) State Agricultural College (1861–1909) Michigan Agricultural College (1909–1925) Michigan State College of Agriculture and Applied Science (1925–1955) Michigan State University of Agriculture and Applied Science (1955–1964)
- Motto: "Spartans Will."
- Type: Public, land-grant, research university
- Established: February 12, 1855; 171 years ago
- Accreditation: HLC
- Academic affiliations: AAU; ORAU; URA; URC; sea-grant; space-grant
- Endowment: $4.6 billion (2025)
- President: Kevin M. Guskiewicz
- Faculty: 5,696 (2026)
- Administrative staff: 6,304 (2026)
- Students: 51,838 (spring 2026)
- Undergraduates: 41,425 (spring 2026)
- Postgraduates: 10,423 (spring 2026)
- Location: East Lansing, Michigan, United States; 42°43′30″N 84°28′48″W
- Campus: 5,200 acres (21 km^{2}); Small city
- Newspaper: The State News
- Colors: Green and white
- Nickname: Spartans
- Sporting affiliations: NCAA Division I FBS – Big Ten
- Mascot: Sparty
- Website: msu.edu

Michigan State University (Michigan State or MSU) is a public land-grant research university in East Lansing, Michigan, United States. It was founded in 1855 as the Agricultural College of the State of Michigan, the first of its kind in the country. After the introduction of the Morrill Act in 1862, the state designated the college a land-grant institution in 1863, making it the first of the land-grant colleges in the United States. The college became coeducational in 1870. Michigan State has facilities across the state, and over 550,500 alumni.

The university's six professional schools include the College of Law (founded in Detroit, in 1891, as the Detroit College of Law and moved to East Lansing in 1997), Eli Broad College of Business; the College of Nursing, the College of Osteopathic Medicine (the world's first state-funded osteopathic college), the College of Human Medicine, and the College of Veterinary Medicine. The university pioneered the studies of music therapy, packaging, hospitality business, supply chain management, and communication sciences.

Michigan State is a member of the Association of American Universities, classified among "R1: Doctoral Universities – Very high research activity", and a Public Ivy institution. MSU ranks among the world's top 100 institutions, according to Time magazine. The university's campus houses the Facility for Rare Isotope Beams, the W. J. Beal Botanical Garden, the Abrams Planetarium, the Wharton Center for Performing Arts, the Eli and Edythe Broad Art Museum, and one of the country's largest residence hall system.

University faculty, alumni, and affiliates include 3 Nobel laureates, 20 Rhodes Scholars, 20 Marshall Scholars, and 8 Pulitzer Prize winners. The Michigan State Spartans compete in the NCAA Division I Big Ten Conference. Spartan teams have won national championships in many sports, including football, men's basketball, ice hockey, and women's cross country.

== History ==
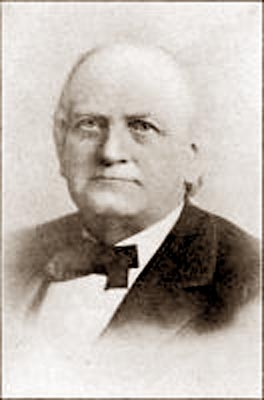
John Clough Holmes, co-founder of the Michigan State Agricultural Society and the founder of the Agricultural College of the State of Michigan, now Michigan State University. His legacy is often contrasted with that of John Harvard, whose 17th-century gift established Harvard University, the nation's oldest college, which was named in his honor.

To no one man is the College so much indebted as John Clough Holmes.

— Theophilus C. Abbot, third president of the State Agricultural College

In early 1855, John Clough Holmes, secretary of the agricultural society, convinced the Michigan legislature to pass an act establishing "a State Agricultural School" to be located on a site selected by the Michigan State Agricultural Society within ten miles of Lansing. On February 12, 1855, Michigan Governor Kinsley S. Bingham signed a bill establishing the nation's first agriculture college, the Agricultural College of the State of Michigan. William J. Beal called Holmes "the most important agent" of the college. Holmes Hall, the home of the Lyman Briggs College, is named in his honor.

The State Board of Education was designated as the institution's governing body. The board also oversaw the Michigan State Normal School in Ypsilanti, which had opened in 1852. Classes began on May 13, 1857, with three buildings, five faculty members, and 63 male students.

Joseph R. Williams, the first president and a passionate promoter of interdisciplinary liberal arts education, encouraged a curriculum that went far beyond practical agriculture: "The course of instruction in said college shall include the following branches of education, viz: an English and scientific course, natural philosophy, chemistry, botany, animal and vegetable anatomy and physiology, geology, mineralogy, meteorology, entomology, veterinary art, mensuration, leveling and political economy, with bookkeeping and the mechanic arts which are directly connected with agriculture..." From its inception, the Agricultural College of the State of Michigan offered courses of study that would characterize the land-grant philosophy of higher education after the passage of the Morrill Act in 1862. Michigan's agricultural college educated people to be well-informed citizens, as well as good farmers.

However, after just two years, Williams ran into conflict with the managing State Board of Education. Despite Williams' eloquent defense of an all-round education for the masses, the board saw the college as inefficient and had far deviated from the agriculture focus as the founder, John Clough Holmes, had anticipated. Indeed, some agriculturalists began protesting against the college's unpractical curriculum with some even calling for the college's abolition. Williams eventually resigned in 1859. The board then reduced the curriculum to a two-year, vocation-oriented farming program, which proved catastrophic and resulted almost overnight in a drastic reduction in enrollment. There was a high demand for an all-round education grounded in the liberal arts tradition instead of a specialized agriculture program, a fact the board disregarded. With a sharp decrease in tuition revenue, the college was soon in dire financial straits and threatened with dissolution.

In 1860, Williams became acting lieutenant governor and helped pass the Reorganization Act of 1861. This restored the college's four-year curriculum and gave the college the power to grant master's degrees. Under the act, a newly created body, known as the State Board of Agriculture, took over from the State Board of Education in running the institution. The college changed its name to State Agricultural College, and its first class graduated in the same year.

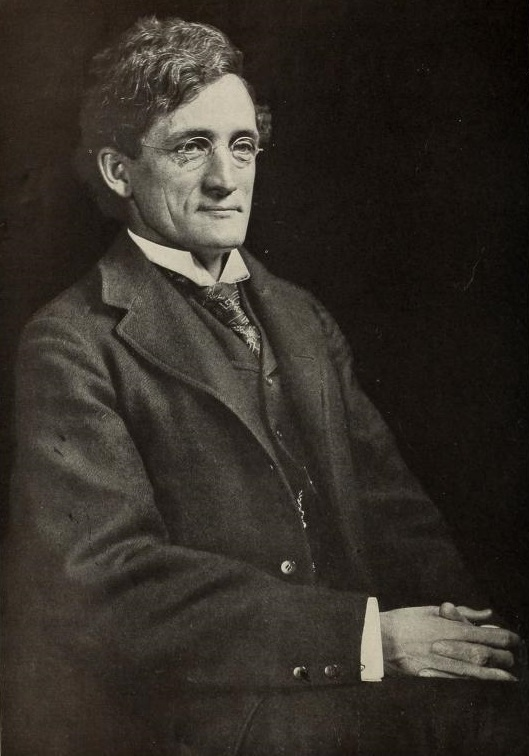
Liberty Hyde Bailey, namesake of Bailey Hall at Cornell, often called the "father of American Horticulture," graduated from the Agricultural College in 1882.

In 1862, President Abraham Lincoln signed the Morrill Land-Grant Acts to support similar colleges nationally, the first instance of federal funding for education. Shortly thereafter, on March 18, 1863, the state designated the college its land-grant institution making Michigan State University the nation's first land-grant college. The federal funding had rescued the Agricultural College from extinction.

Although the school's then-isolated location limited student housing and enrollment during the 19th century, the college became reputable, largely due to alumni who went on to distinguished careers, many of whom led or taught in other land-grant colleges. While the institution emphasized scientific agriculture, its graduates went into a wide variety of professions.

The college first admitted women in 1870, although there were no female residence halls. The few women who enrolled boarded with faculty families or made the arduous stagecoach trek from Lansing. From the early days, female students took the same rigorous scientific agriculture courses as male students. In 1896, the faculty created a "Women Course" that melded a home economics curriculum with liberal arts and sciences. That same year, the college turned the Abbot Hall male dorm into a women's dormitory.

It was not until 1899 that the State Agricultural College admitted its first African American student, William O. Thompson. After graduation, he taught at what is now Tuskegee University. A few years later, Myrtle Craig became the first woman African American student to enroll at the college. Two years later, the college changed its name to Michigan Agricultural College.

During the early 20th century, Michigan Agricultural College expanded its curriculum well beyond agriculture. By 1925, it had expanded enough to change its name to Michigan State College of Agriculture and Applied Science (MSC), or "Michigan State" for short. In 1941, the Secretary of the State Board of Agriculture, John A. Hannah, became president of the college.

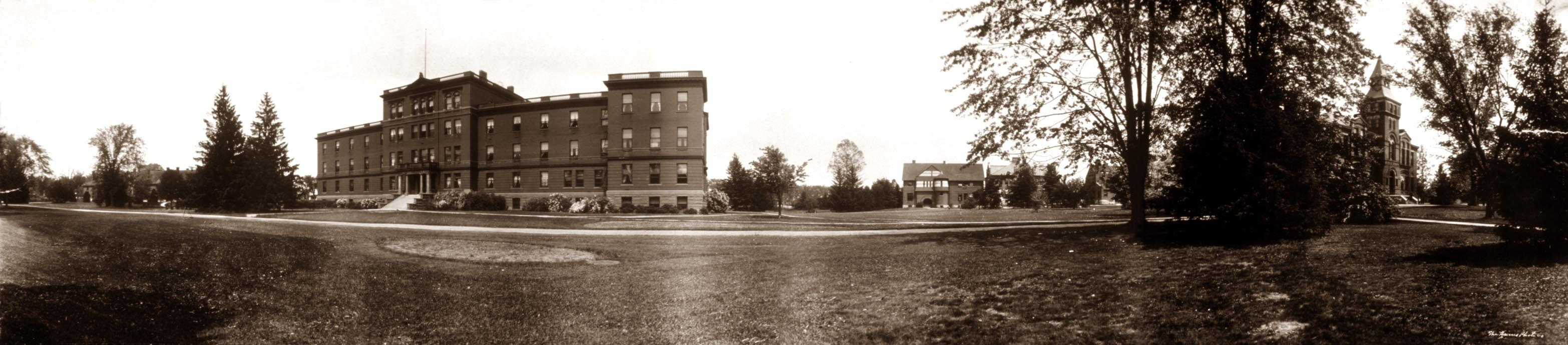
Morrill Hall in 1912, known at the time as the "Women's Building". To the right are Horticulture, Bacteriology, Botany, and Administration (Library–Museum).

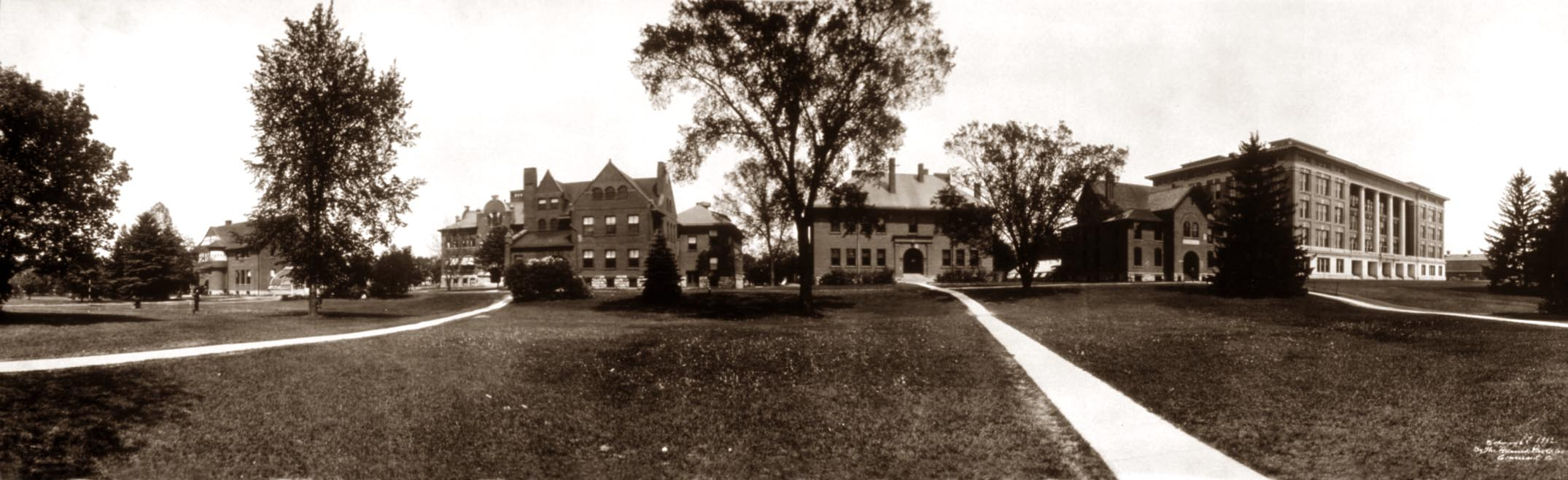
Michigan Agricultural College's Laboratory Row in 1912: Horticulture, Bacteriology, Botany, Dairy, Entomology, and Agriculture

After World War II, Hannah began the largest expansion in the institution's history, with the help of the 1945 G.I. Bill, which helped World War II veterans gain college educations. One of Hannah's strategies was to build a new dormitory building, enroll enough students to fill it, and use the income to start construction of another dormitory. Under his plan, enrollment increased from 15,000 in 1950 to 38,000 in 1965.

Six years later, during the school's centennial year of 1955, the State of Michigan officially designated the school as a university, even though Hannah and others felt it had been one for decades. The college then became Michigan State University of Agriculture and Applied Science. During the 1950s, Michigan State University was the "preeminent" example of a group of former agricultural colleges which had already evolved into state colleges and were attempting to become research universities. In 1957, Hannah continued MSU's expansion by co-founding Michigan State University–Oakland, now Oakland University, with Matilda Dodge Wilson. After the ratification of the Michigan Constitution of 1964, the university's governing body changed its name from the State Board of Agriculture to the Michigan State University Board of Trustees. At that time, the school's name was officially shortened to simply Michigan State University, though since the 1920s longstanding convention omitted the "Agriculture and Applied Science" part of the name.

MSU was affiliated with Oakland University in Rochester Hills, Michigan, from the time of the latter's founding in 1957 (as Michigan State University-Oakland), until 1970 when Oakland University gained institutional independence.

In September 2005, President Lou Anna Simon called for Michigan State to become the global model leader for land-grant institutions by 2012. Her plans included creating a new residential college and increased grants awarded from the National Institutes of Health past the US$100 million mark. While there are over 100 land-grant universities in the United States, she stated she would like Michigan State University to be the leader.

== Campus ==
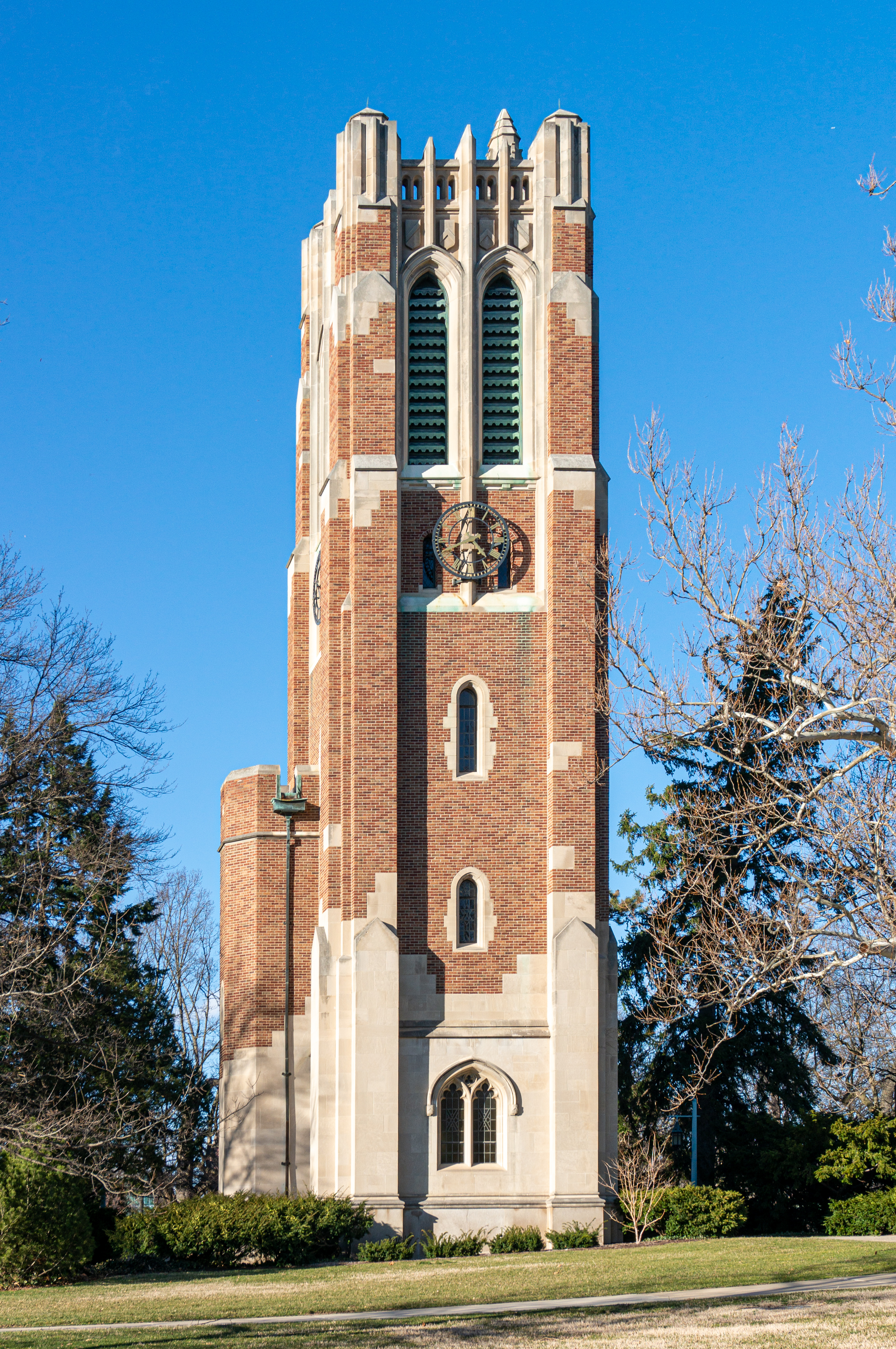
Beaumont Tower marks the site of College Hall.

MSU's sprawling campus is in East Lansing, Michigan. The campus is perched on the banks of the Red Cedar River. Development of the campus started in 1856 with three buildings: a multipurpose College Hall building, a dormitory later called "Saints' Rest", and a barn. Today, MSU's contiguous campus consists of 5,200 acres (2,100 ha), 2,000 acres (810 ha) of which are developed. There are 563 buildings: 107 for academics, 131 for agriculture, 166 for housing and food service, and 42 for athletics. Overall, the university has 22,763,025 square feet (2,114,754.2 m^{2}) of indoor space. Connecting it all is 60 miles (97 km) of roads and 120 miles (190 km) of sidewalks. The university manages land holdings totaling more than 26,000 acres throughout Michigan.

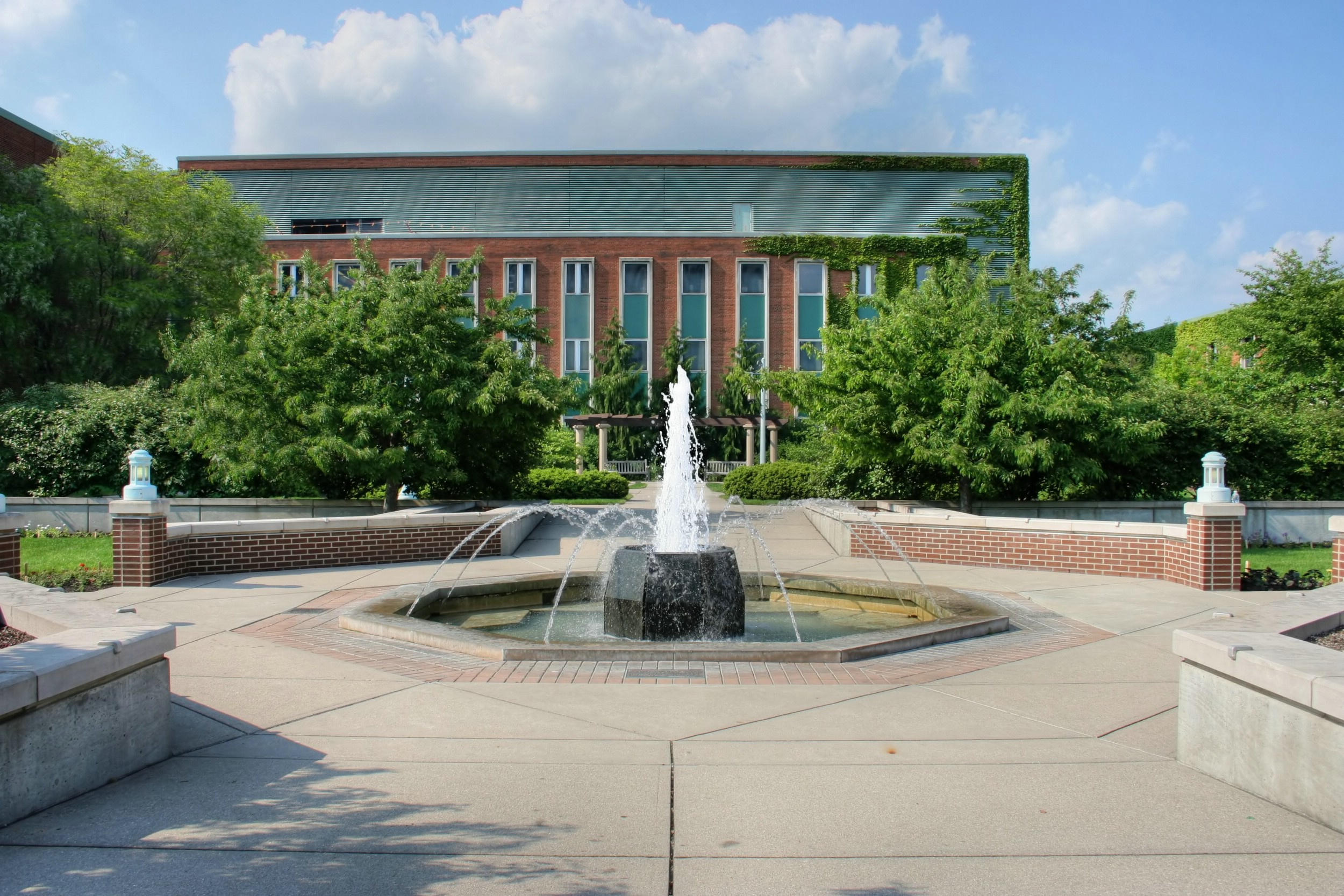
The water fountain, with the Plant Biology building in the background

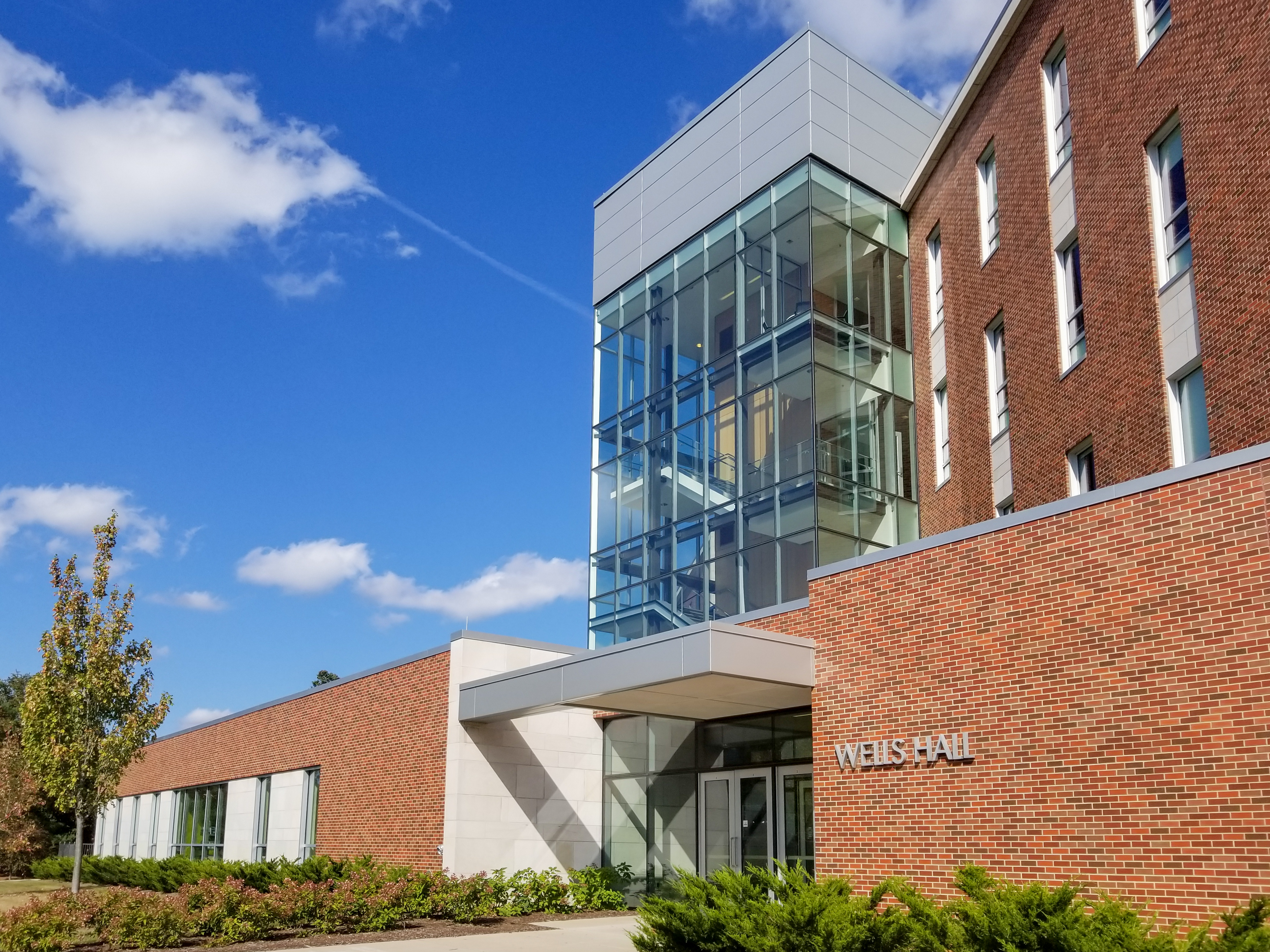
Wells Hall, where a meth lab was discovered in 2026

In early 2017, construction of a $22.5 million solar project began at five parking lots on campus. MSU's solar carport array is constructed on five of the university's largest commuter parking lots and covers 5,000 parking spaces. The solar carports are designed to deliver a peak power of 10.5 Megawatts and an annual energy of 15 million kilowatt-hours, which is enough to power approximately 1,800 Michigan homes. The solar carport project was recognized at the Smart Energy Decisions Innovation Summit 2018, earning the Onsite Renewable Energy award for "The Largest Carport Solar Array in North America."

Some land owned by MSU is in Lansing, Lansing Charter Township, Alaiedon Township, Delhi Charter Township, and Meridian Charter Township.

=== North campus ===
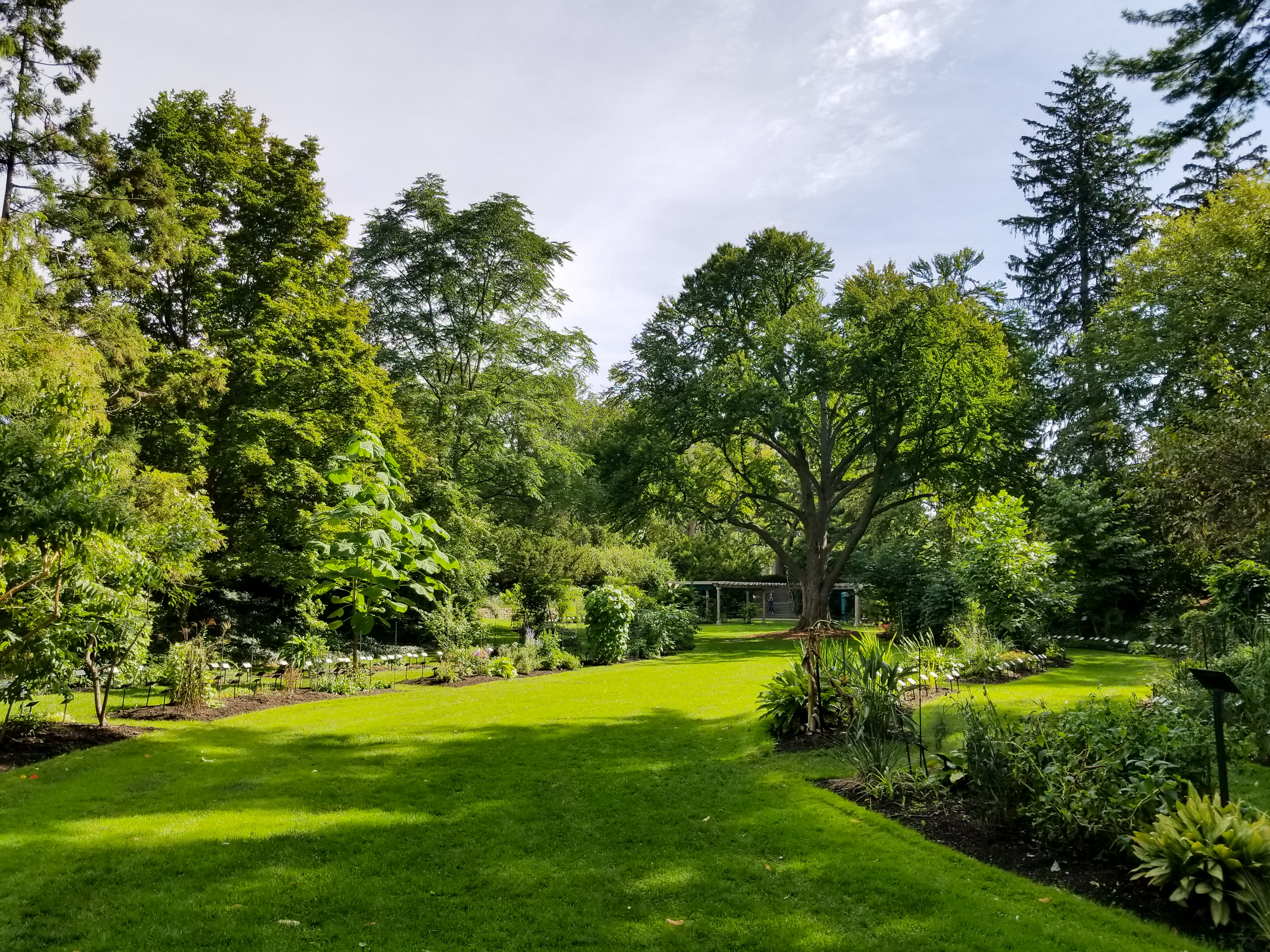
W. J. Beal Botanical Garden

The oldest part of campus lies on the Red Cedar river's north bank. It includes Collegiate Gothic architecture, plentiful trees, and curving roads with few straight lines. The college built its first three buildings here, of which none survive. Other historic buildings north of the river include the president's official residence, Cowles House; and Beaumont Tower, a carillon clock tower marking the site of College Hall, the original classroom building. To the east lies Eustace–Cole Hall, America's first freestanding horticulture laboratory. Other landmarks include the bronze statue of former president John A. Hannah, the W. J. Beal Botanical Garden, and the painted boulder known as "The Rock", a popular spot for theater, tailgating, and candlelight vigils. On the campus's northwest corner is the university's hotel, the Kellogg Hotel and Conference Center. The university also has two museums. MSU Museum, initiated in 1857, is one of the Midwest's oldest museums and is accredited by the American Alliance of Museums. The Eli and Edythe Broad Art Museum, designed by Zaha Hadid, opened in 2012 as MSU's primary art gallery, featuring local, national, and international artists, and a permanent collection of over 10,000 works.

In recent years, university planning efforts have emphasized repurposing previously developed sites to accommodate new construction while protecting designated green spaces. The STEM Teaching and Learning Facility (completed in 2021) replaced a former coal plant and incorporates elements of the original structure; the Multicultural Center (2025) was built on a former parking lot; and the Student Recreation and Wellness Center is rising on the former Cherry Lane Apartments site. Additional projects include the Leinweber Center for Engineering and Digital Innovation that will replace several existing structures, reflecting the university's land-use strategy of prioritizing redevelopment and long-term sustainability in its campus master plan.

=== South campus ===
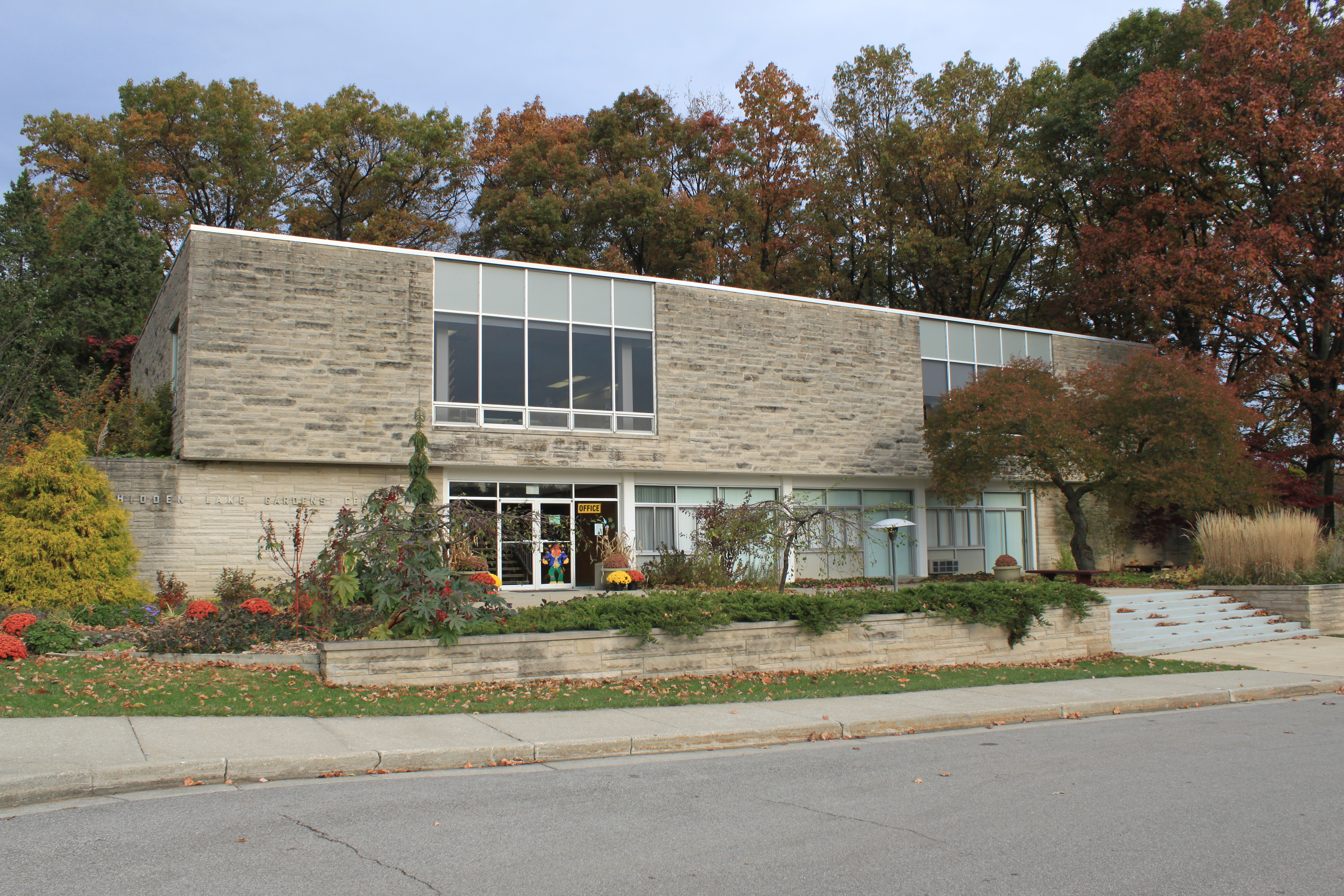
Hidden Lake Gardens Visitor Center

The campus south of the river consists mostly of post-World War II International Style buildings, and is characterized by sparser foliage, relatively straight roadways, and many parking lots. The "2020 Vision" Master Plan proposes replacing these parking lots with parking ramps and green space, but these plans will take many years to reach fruition. As part of the master plan, the university erected a new bronze statue of The Spartan in 2005 to be placed at the intersection of Chestnut and Kalamazoo, just south of the Red Cedar River. This replica replaced the original modernist terra cotta statue, which can still be seen inside Spartan Stadium. Notable academic and research buildings on the South Campus include the Cyclotron, the College of Law, the Facility for Rare Isotope Beams (FRIB), Interdisciplinary Science and Technology Building, and the Broad College of Business.

This part of campus is home to the MSU Horticulture Gardens and the adjoining 4-H Children's Garden. South of the gardens lie the Canadian National and CSX railroads, which divide the main campus from thousands of acres of university-owned farmland. The university's agricultural facilities include the Horse, Dairy Cattle, Beef Cattle, Swine, Sheep, and Poultry Teaching and Research Farms, as well as the Air Quality Control Lab and the Veterinary Diagnostic Laboratory.

=== Kellogg Hotel and Conference Center ===
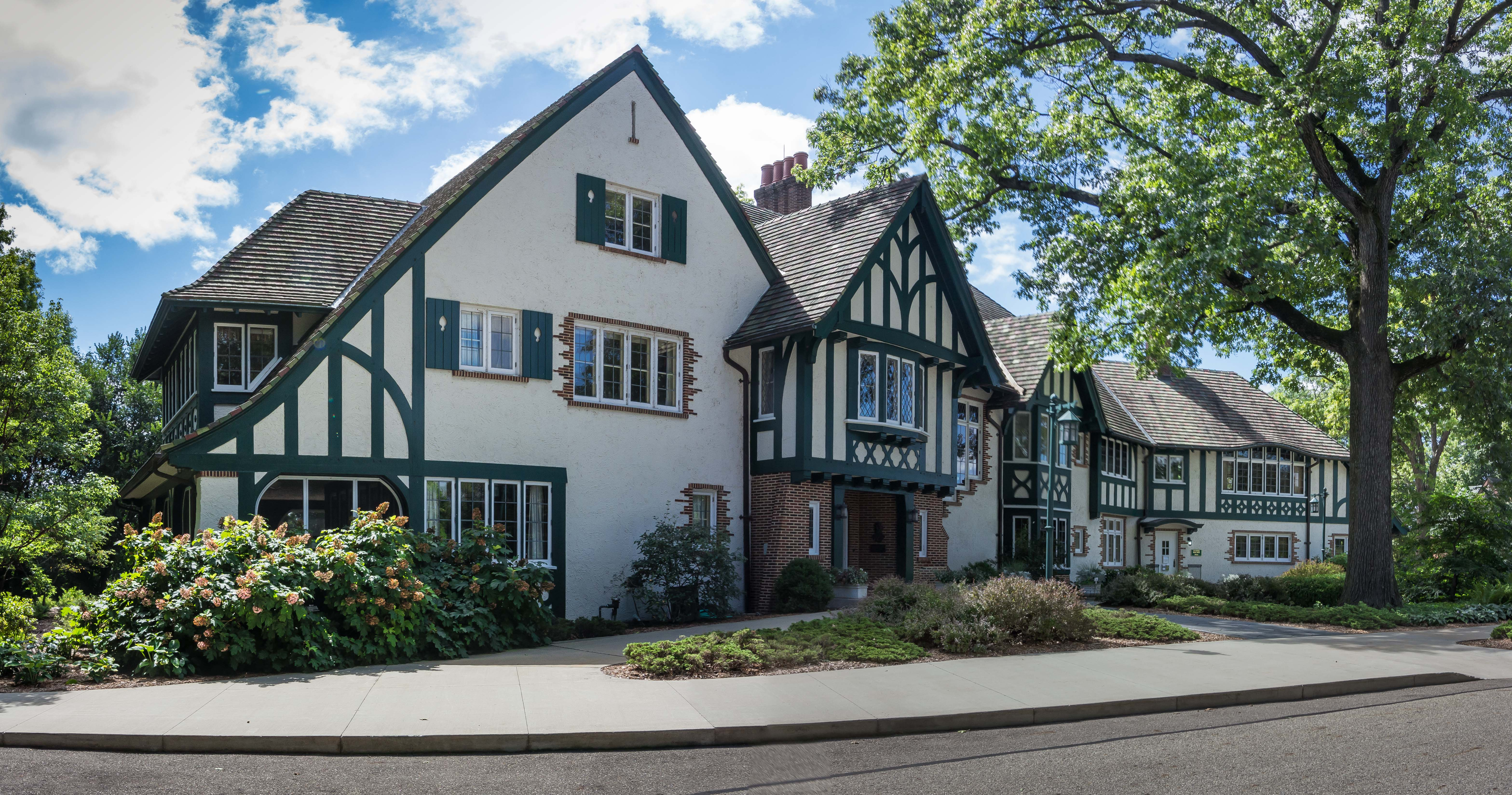
Kellogg House on Gull Lake. William Keith Kellogg donated his summer home to Michigan State University. It is used as a conference center for MSU's Biological and Agricultural Research.

The Kellogg Hotel and Conference Center is a full service hotel and a business-friendly conference center. It is on the northwest corner of Michigan State University's campus, across from the Brody Complex, on Harrison Road just south of Michigan Avenue. The hotel's 160 rooms and suites can accommodate anyone staying in East Lansing for a business conference, sporting event or an on-campus visit. Besides a lodging facility, the Kellogg Hotel and Conference Center is a "learning laboratory for the 300–400 students each year that are enrolled in The School of Hospitality Business and other majors." The Kellogg Hotel and Conference Center strives to facilitate education by hosting conferences and seminars.

=== Dubai campus ===
MSU ran a small campus at Dubai Knowledge Village, Dubai, United Arab Emirates. It first offered only one program, a master's program in human resources and labor relations. In 2011, it added a master's program in Public Health.

Previously, MSU established an education center in Dubai that offered six undergraduate programs, thereby becoming the first American university with a presence in Dubai International Academic City. The university attracted 100 students in 2007, its first year, but the school was unable to achieve the 100–150 new students per year needed for the program to be viable, and in 2010 MSU closed the program and the campus.

=== Detroit campus ===
MSU has a large presence in downtown Detroit. This campus includes programs with the College of Education, Detroit Outreach Admissions, MSU Community Music School of Detroit, and the Study of Active Neighborhoods in Detroit (StAND). MSU began a partnership with Apple in 2022, creating the Apple Developer Academy, which provides students with app development training, business skills and preparation for careers in the growing app economy. In 2025, the two institutions announced the Apple Manufacturing Academy, a partnership to train and support the next generation of U.S. manufacturers. On June 13, 2023, MSU purchased a majority stake in Detroit's iconic Fisher Building. The MSU Research Foundation opened a startup incubator inside the Fisher Building later that year. In early 2023 MSU announced they would begin collaborating with Henry Ford Health on a new research center in Detroit that will focus on cancer, neuroscience, cardiometabolic diseases, immunology and precision health.

=== College of Human Medicine campuses ===
The College of Human Medicine operates regional campuses in partnership with health systems across Michigan. The largest regional campus is the Secchia Campus in Grand Rapids, which opened in 2010 following the medical school's expansion. The Grand Rapids Campus partners with multiple hospitals on Grand Rapid's Medical Mile and throughout West Michigan.

Other regional campuses include:

- Flint – affiliated with Hurley Medical Center and McLaren Flint.
- Midland – located at MyMichigan Health.
- Traverse City – affiliated with Munson Medical Center.
- Marquette – affiliated with UP Health System.
- Southfield – affiliated with Henry Ford Providence Southfield Hospital and Henry Ford Providence Novi Hospital.
- Detroit – affiliated with Henry Ford Health.

== Admissions ==
=== Undergraduate ===
Undergraduate admissions statistics
- 2026 entering class
- Admit rate: 86.1%
- Yield rate: 17.8%

Test scores middle 50%^{[i]}
- SAT Total: 1110–1310
- ACT Composite: 25–31

High school GPA
- Average: 3.5-4.0

Michigan State University offers a rolling admissions system, with an early action (non-binding) deadline of November 1. Students who apply early action will receive an admissions decision by January 15. Students who apply for regular admission by February 1 will receive an admissions decision by March 31, and those who apply by April 1 will receive an admissions decision on a rolling basis. The deadline for admitted students to accept their admission is May 1.

In its 2026 rankings, U.S. News & World Report ranked MSU among the top 30 public universities in the United States and placed 33 undergraduate and graduate programs and concentrations among the nation's top 25. For students enrolling in fall 2026, Michigan State received 62,539 applications and admitted 53,851 applicants (86.1%). Of those admitted, 9,639 enrolled, yielding an enrollment rate of 17.8%. The university's first-year retention rate is 90%, and its six-year graduation rate is 80%.

The university has continued to offer test-optional admissions since the COVID-19 pandemic. Of the enrolled freshmen in 2025 who submitted SAT scores, the middle 50 percent composite score was 1110–1320. Of incoming freshmen who submitted ACT scores, the middle 50 percent composite score was between 26 and 31. International students may still be required to submit English language proficiency test scores.

Students can apply through MSU, Coalition or the Common App. Although there are no minimum requirements to apply to Michigan State, applicants are encouraged to take a college preparatory curriculum in high school. Students are also advised to apply early for maximum scholarship consideration.

All admitted students are automatically considered for scholarships. In most cases, the application for admission, including the required essay, is enough for award consideration (some scholarships may require supplemental documents). In 2026, MSU also awarded full merit scholarships to 51 high-achieving incoming students for the upcoming year.

Undergraduate admission statistics of Michigan State University
	2025	2024	2023	2022	2021
Applicants	64,492	62,138	58,879	55,525	50,629
Admits	52,410	52,690	49,414	47,034	41,150
Admit rate	81.3%	84.8%	83.9%	84.7%	83.3%
Enrolled	9,335	9,625	9,355	9,620	9,028
Yield rate	17.8%	18.3%	18.9%	20.5%	21.4%
ACT composite* (out of 36)	25-31 (6.8%^{†})	24–30 (8%^{†})	24–30 (8.8%^{†})	24–30 (14%^{†})	23–29 (16%^{†})
SAT composite* (out of 1600)	1100-1310 (51.5%^{†})	1100–1310 (52%^{†})	1100–1300 (54.8%^{†})	1110–1320 (51%^{†})	1110–1310 (48%^{†})
* middle 50% range^{†} percentage of first-time freshmen who chose to submit

=== Graduate ===
For fall 2024, the Michigan State University College of Law received 1,359 applications and accepted 433 (31.86%). Of those accepted, 139 enrolled, a yield rate of 32.1%. The College of Law had a middle-50% LSAT range of 157-162 for the 2024 first year class.

== Academics ==
=== Rankings ===
Academic rankings

National
- Forbes: 49
- U.S. News & World Report: 44 (tie)
- Washington Monthly: 43
- WSJ/College Pulse: 60

Global
- ARWU: 111
- QS: 122 (tie)
- THE: 105
- U.S. News & World Report: 83

USNWR Global Program Rankings
Program	Ranking
Plant and Animal Science	9
Agricultural Sciences	23
Economics and Business	1
Environment/Ecology	40
Social Sciences and Public Health	49
Arts and Humanities	57
Computer Science	77
Biotechnology and Applied Microbiology	87
Microbiology	81
Mathematics	78
Psychiatry/Psychology	80
Physics	97
Biology and Biochemistry	119
Space Science	151
Cardiac and Cardiovascular Systems	149
Public, Environmental and Occupational Health	156
Neuroscience and Behavior	223
Engineering	68
Molecular Biology and Genetics	153
Materials Science	239
Electrical and Electronic Engineering	219
Physical Chemistry	428
Food Science and Technology	28
Geosciences	171
Clinical Medicine	202
Energy and Fuels	244
Oncology	371
Chemistry	293

USNWR National Undergraduate Rankings
	Ranking
Nursing	39
Engineering (overall)	45
Biological/Agricultural Engineering	6
Electrical Engineering	30
Mechanical Engineering	36
Computer Science	60
Business (overall)	1
Management	11
Management Information Systems	19
International Business	20
Accounting	21
Marketing	35
Productions/Operations Management	5
Supply Chain Management/Logistics	1

USNWR National Graduate Rankings
	Ranking
Rehabilitation Counseling	1
Criminology	9
Veterinary Medicine	17
Education	22
Physics	32
Nursing–Anesthesia	29
Economics	34
Social Work	36
Political Science	37
Speech-Language Pathology	38
Business	36
Engineering	59
Clinical Psychology	43
History	43
Psychology	39
Biological Sciences	68
Biostatistics	41
Mathematics	39
Chemistry	42
Statistics	30
English	53
Fine Arts	53
Sociology	54
Computer Science	60
Nursing: Doctorate	63
Nursing: Master's	68
Earth Sciences	56
Medicine: Research	88
Medicine: Primary Care	46
Law	91

In 2026, TIME/Statista ranked MSU No. 85 globally (and No. 14 among U.S. public universities). In its 2026 rankings, Times Higher Education World University Rankings ranked MSU 105th in the world. Michigan State ranks 151st in the world for 2025, according to the Academic Ranking of World Universities. Washington Monthly ranked MSU 43rd nationally for 2024. The publication also ranked Michigan State No. 16 as a Best Bang for Your Buck College in the Midwest for 2025. The 2026 QS World University Rankings placed it at 182nd internationally. In its 2025-2026 edition, U.S. News & World Report ranked it as tied for the 29th best public university in the United States, tied for 64th nationally, and tied for 37th among best universities for veterans.

In its 2026 edition, U.S. News & World Report ranked the following MSU graduate programs number one in the country: elementary teacher education and secondary teacher education (#1 for 31 straight years), curriculum and instruction and the online graduate program in educational administration and supervision. No. 2 ranked programs include educational administration, higher education administration, and rehabilitation counseling.

The Eli Broad College of Business was ranked No. 45 nationally and No. 20 among public programs for 2025-26 by Bloomberg Businessweek. The college had a placement rate of 99% for its graduating class (undergraduate) in 2025. In addition, the college's undergraduate supply chain program is ranked No. 1 nationally and the accounting program is ranked 22nd. The MBA program is ranked #19 among public institutions by U.S. News and World Report.

The College of Communication Arts and Sciences was established in 1955 and was the first of its kind in the United States. In 2025, its communication program was ranked #5 by the Shanghai Academic Ranking of World Universities. The communication and media studies program ranks in the top 25 by QS World University Rankings for 2026. The game design program is ranked in the top 15 nationally by Princeton Review.

=== Collections and museums ===
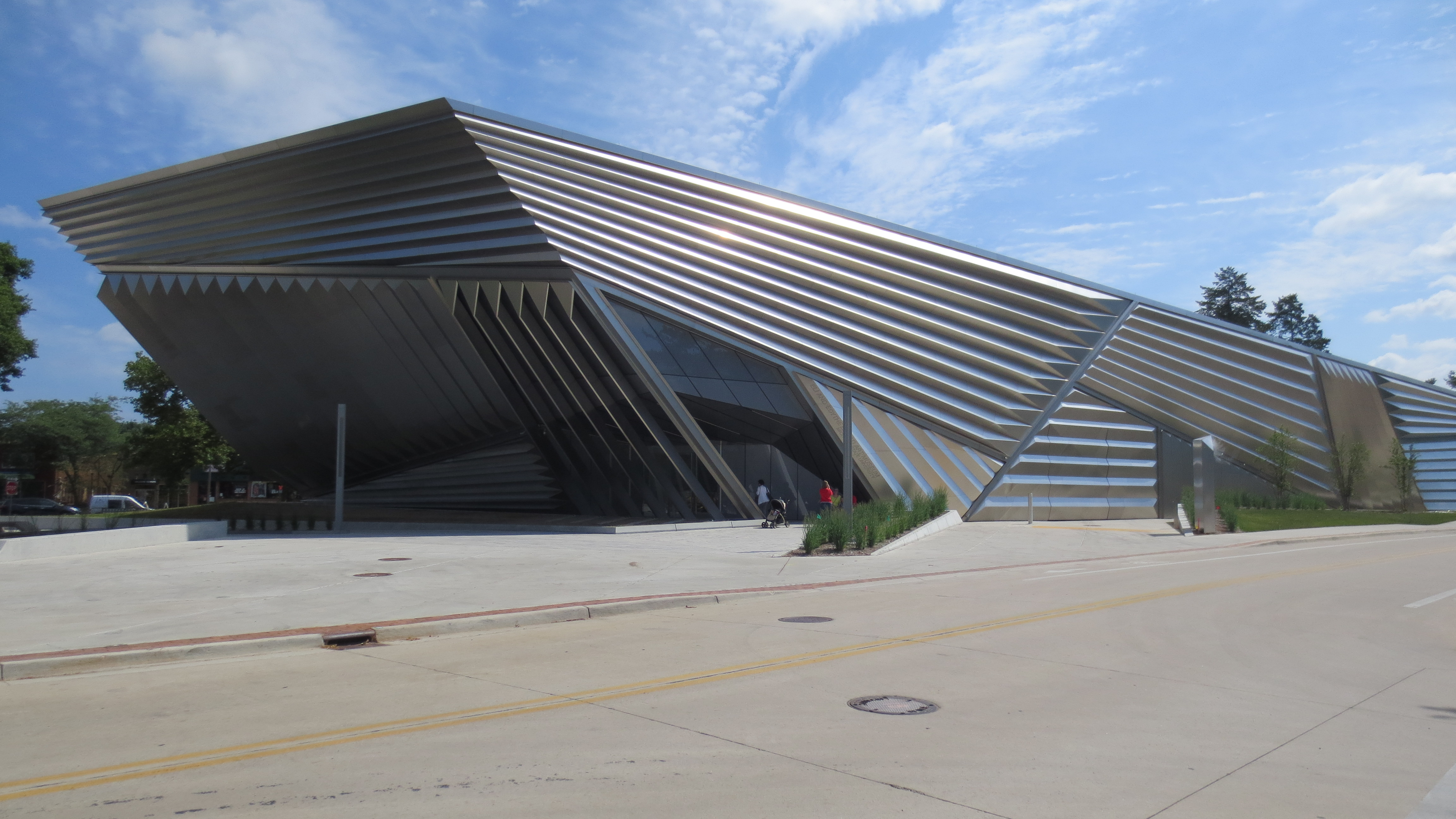
Eli and Edythe Broad Art Museum

The Eli and Edythe Broad Art Museum is the university's contemporary art museum.

The MSU Museum is the university's oldest museum, founded in 1857. It is Michigan's first Smithsonian Affiliate. The museum holds collections in anthropology, folklife, cultural heritage and history, mammalogy, ornithology, herpetology, ichthyology, and vertebrate paleontology.

Michigan State University Libraries comprise North America's 29th largest academic library system with over 4.9 million volumes and 6.7 million microforms.

=== Research ===
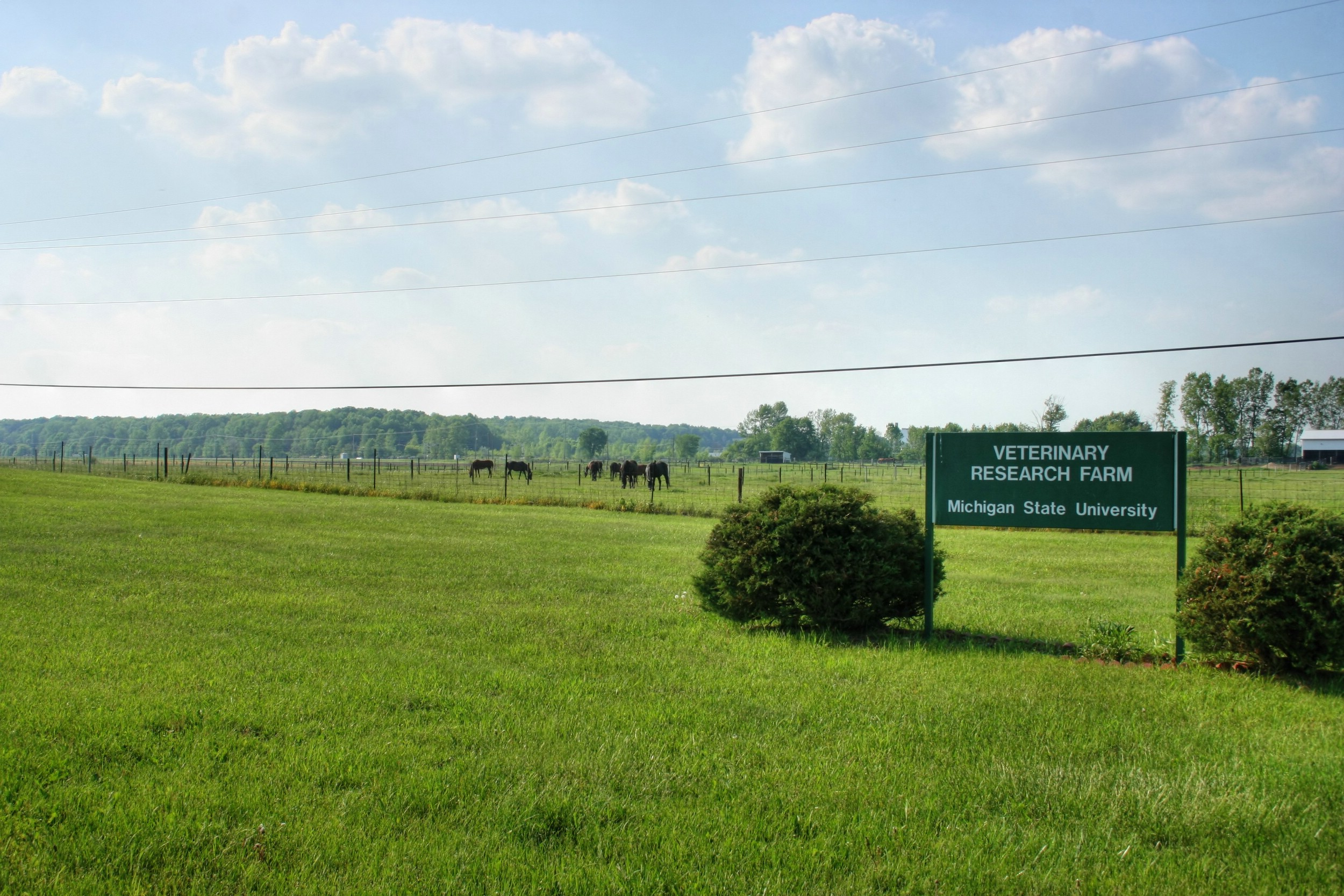
Veterinary Research Farm

The university has a long history of academic research and innovation. In 1877, botany professor William J. Beal performed the first documented genetic crosses to produce hybrid corn, which led to increased yields. MSU dairy professor G. Malcolm Trout improved the process for the homogenization of milk in the 1930s, making it more commercially viable. In the 1960s, MSU scientists developed cisplatin, a leading cancer fighting drug, and followed that work with the derivative, carboplatin. Albert Fert, an adjunct professor at MSU, was awarded the 2007 Nobel Prize in Physics together with Peter Grünberg.

Michigan State continues its research with facilities such as the U.S. Department of Energy-sponsored MSU-DOE Plant Research Laboratory and a particle accelerator called the National Superconducting Cyclotron Laboratory. The U.S. Department of Energy Office of Science named Michigan State University as the site for the Facility for Rare Isotope Beams (FRIB) facility. Construction began in 2014 and was completed in 2022. The $730 million facility has a goal to attract top researchers from around the world to conduct experiments in basic nuclear science, astrophysics, and applications of isotopes to other fields.

In 2004, scientists at the cyclotron produced and observed a new isotope of the element germanium, called Ge-60. In that same year, Michigan State, in consortium with the University of North Carolina at Chapel Hill and the government of Brazil, broke ground on the 4.1-meter Southern Astrophysical Research Telescope (SOAR) in the Andes Mountains of Chile. The consortium telescope will allow the Physics & Astronomy department to study galaxy formation and origins. Since 1999, MSU has been part of a consortium called the Michigan Life Sciences Corridor, which aims to develop biotechnology research in the State of Michigan. Finally, the College of Communication Arts and Sciences' Quello Center researches issues of information and communication management.

Michigan State, the University of Michigan, and Wayne State University created the University Research Corridor in 2006. This alliance was formed to transform and strengthen Michigan's economy by reaching out to businesses, policymakers, innovators, investors and the public to speed up technology transfer, make resources more accessible and attract new jobs to the state.

=== Endowment ===
MSU's (private, non-Morrill Act) endowment started in 1916, when the Engineering Building burned down. Automobile magnate Ransom E. Olds helped the program stay afloat with a gift of $100,000, equivalent to $2.96 million in 2025.

There was a time when MSU lagged behind peer institutions in terms of endowments. As recently as the early 1990s, MSU was last among the eleven Big Ten schools (of the time), with barely over $100 million in endowment funds. This changed dramatically in the 2000s decade, when the university started a campaign to increase the size of the endowment.

At the close of fiscal year 2004–2005, the endowment had risen to $1.325 billion, raising the university to sixth of the 11 Big Ten schools in terms of endowment; within $2 million of the fifth-rated school. As of June 30, 2021, MSU's endowment had a market value of $4.4 billion.

== Colleges ==
MSU has over 200 academic programs offered by 17 degree-granting colleges.

=== Residential colleges ===
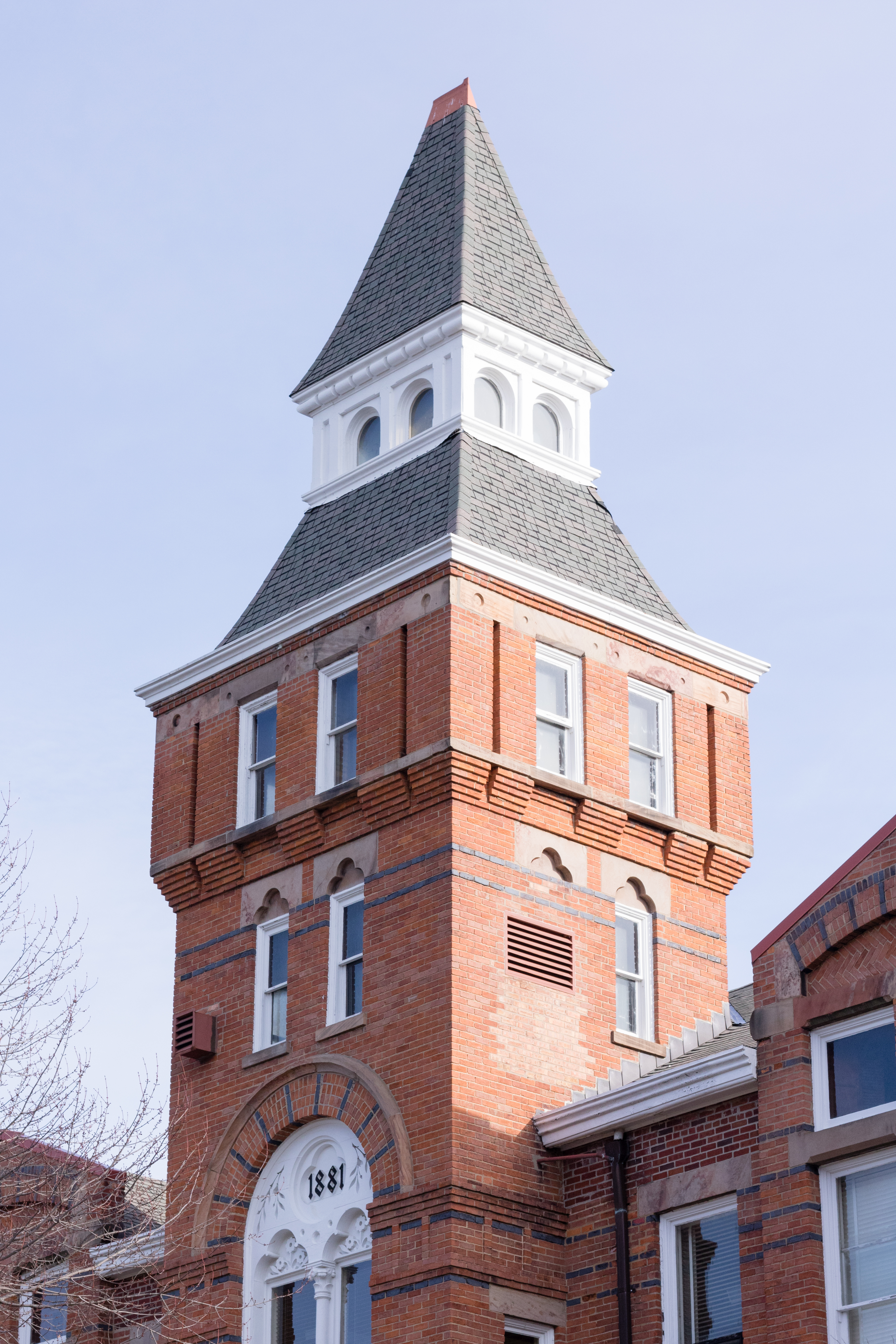
Linton Hall

MSU's first residential college, Justin Morrill College started in 1965 with an interdisciplinary curriculum. MSU closed Morrill College in 1979, but today the university has three residential colleges, including the recent opening of the Residential College in Arts & Humanities (RCAH) located in Snyder and Phillips halls.

==== James Madison College ====
Established in 1967, James Madison College is a smaller component residential college featuring multidisciplinary programs in the social sciences, founded on a model of liberal education. James Madison College is housed in Case Hall. Classes in the college are small, with an average of 25 students, and most instructors are tenure track faculty. James Madison College has about 1150 students total, with each freshman class containing about 320 students. Each of Madison's four majors—Social Relations and Policy, International Relations, Political Theory and Constitutional Democracy, and Comparative Cultures and Politics—requires two years of foreign language and one semester of "field experience" in an internship or study abroad program. Although Madison students make up about 4% of MSU graduates, they represent around 35% of the MSU's Phi Beta Kappa members.

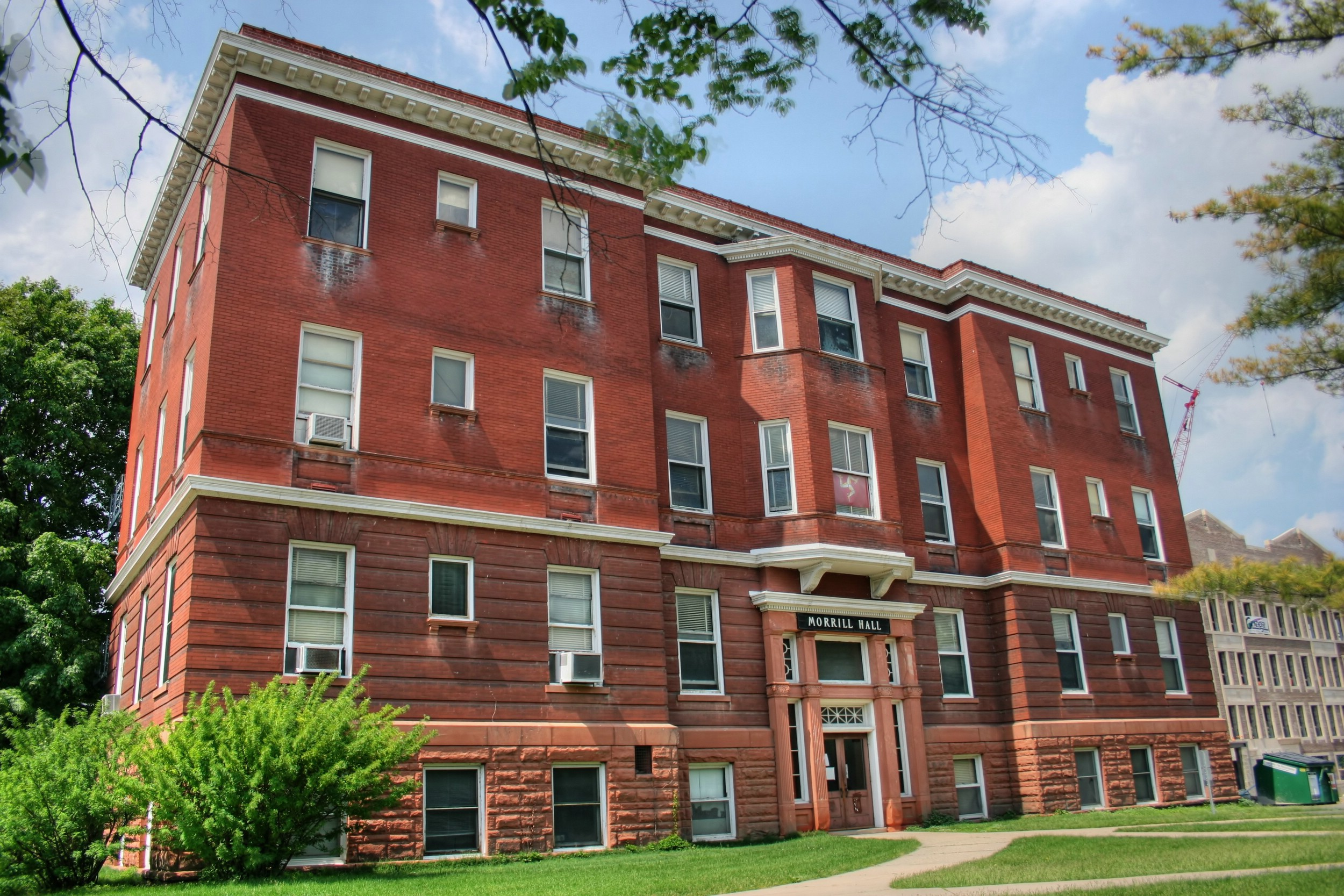
Morrill Hall

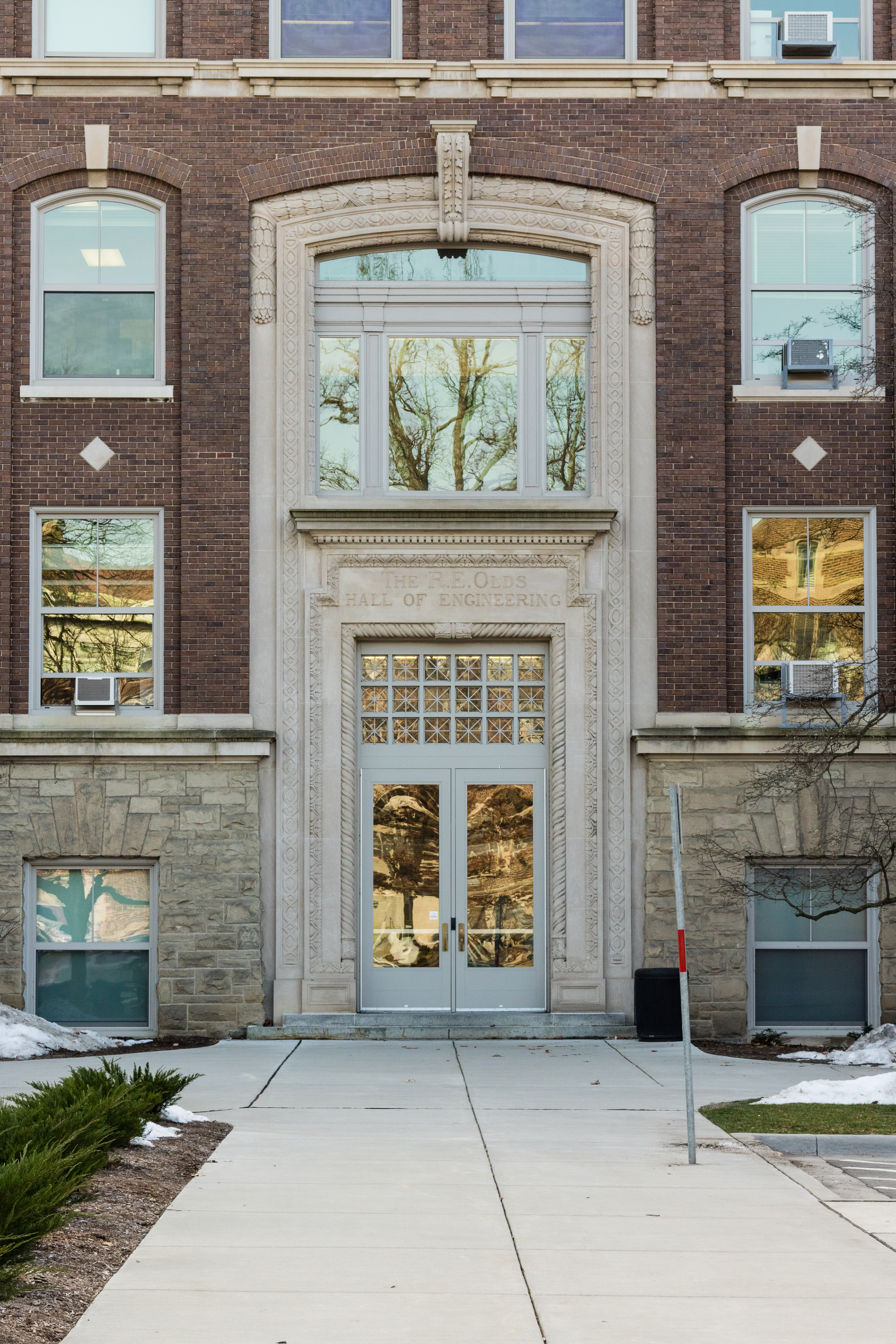
Olds Hall

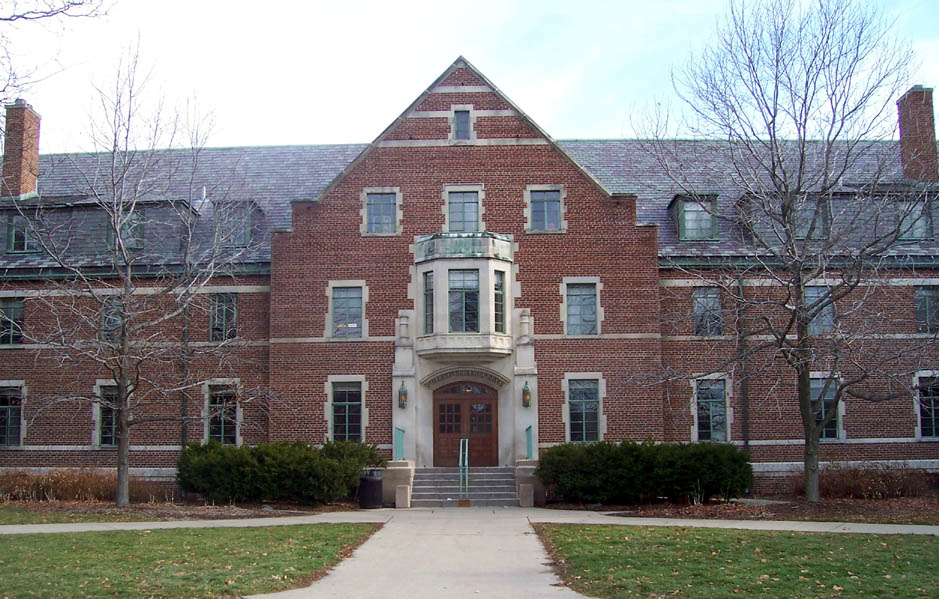
Snyder-Phillips Hall was built in 1947. The building was expanded to make room for a new residential college.

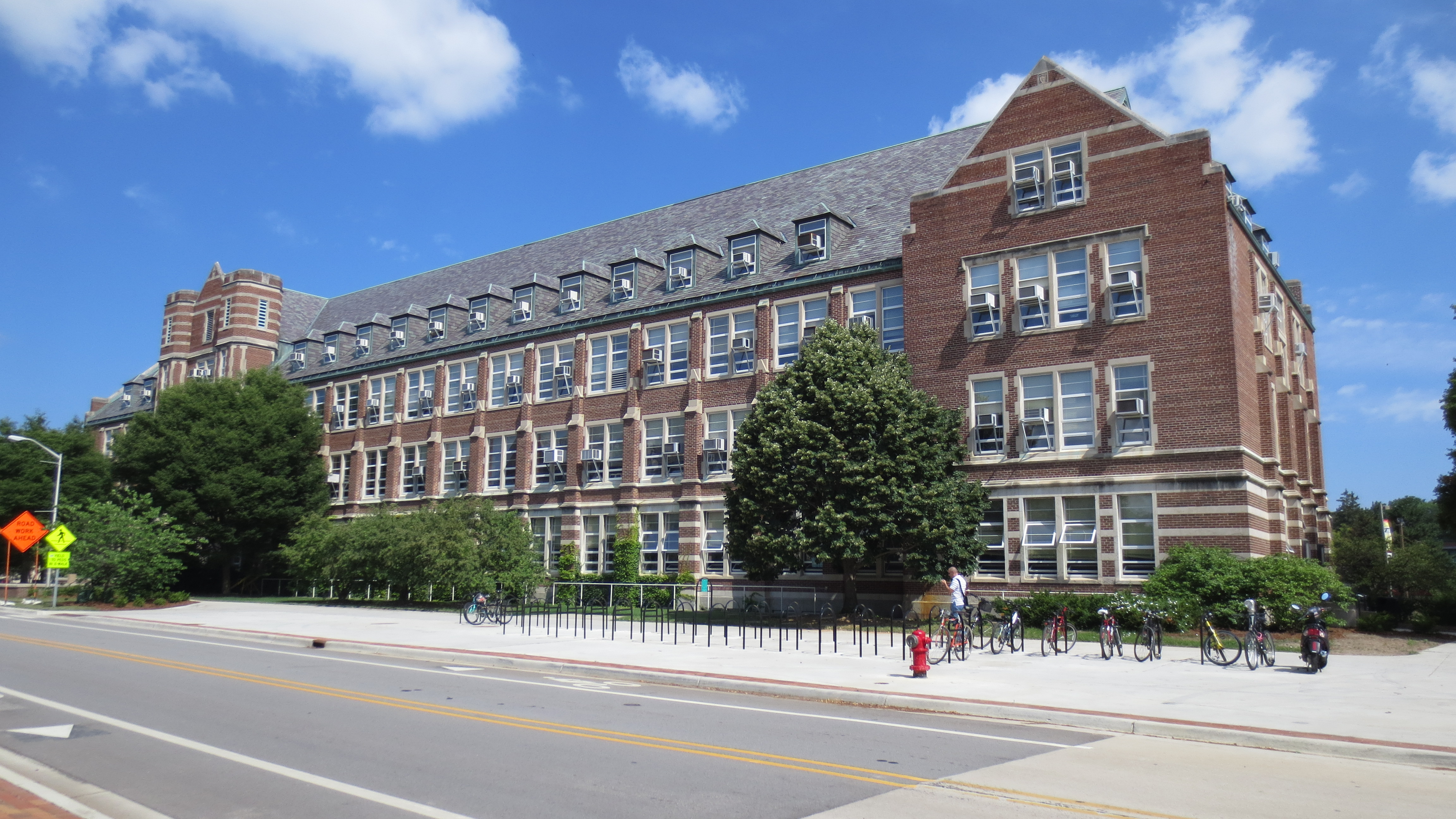
Berkey Hall

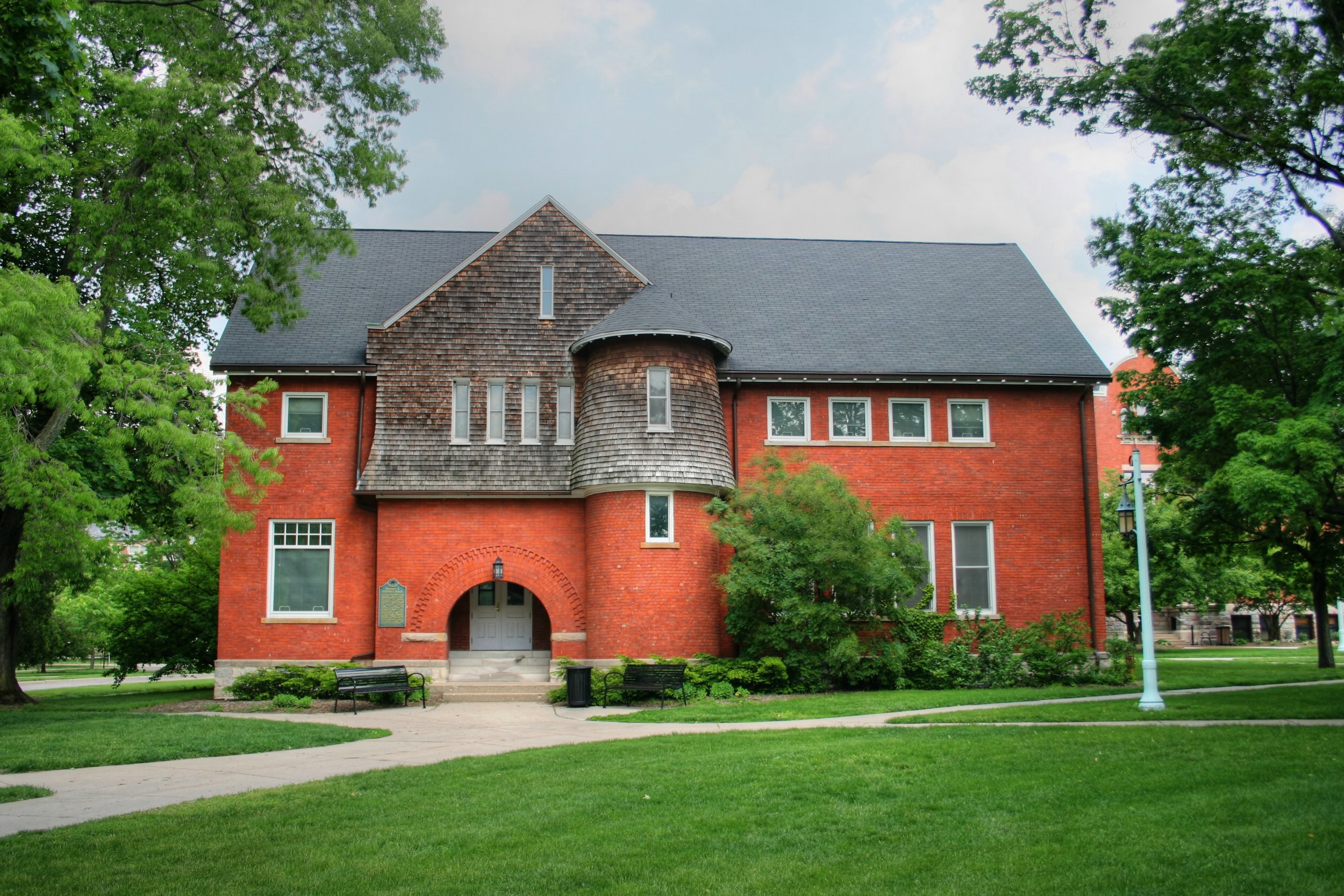
Eustace-Cole Hall was the United States' first freestanding horticulture laboratory. It is the only MSU building on the National Register of Historic Places. Additionally, Eustace-Cole Hall houses the offices of the Michigan State University Honors College.

==== Lyman Briggs College ====
Also established in 1967, Lyman Briggs College teaches math and science within social, historical and philosophical contexts. Many Lyman Briggs students intend to pursue careers in medicine, but the school supports over 30 coordinate majors, from human biology to computer sciences. Lyman Briggs is one of the few colleges that lets undergraduates teach as "Learning Assistants."

==== Residential College in the Arts and Humanities ====
MSU's newest residential college is the Residential College in the Arts and Humanities (RCAH). Founded October 21, 2005, RCAH provides around 600 undergraduates with an individualized curriculum in the liberal, visual and performing arts. Though all the students will graduate with the same degree, MSU encourages students in the college to get a second degree or specialization. The university houses the new college in a newly renovated Snyder-Phillips Hall, the location of MSU's first residential college, Justin Morrill College.

=== Professional schools ===
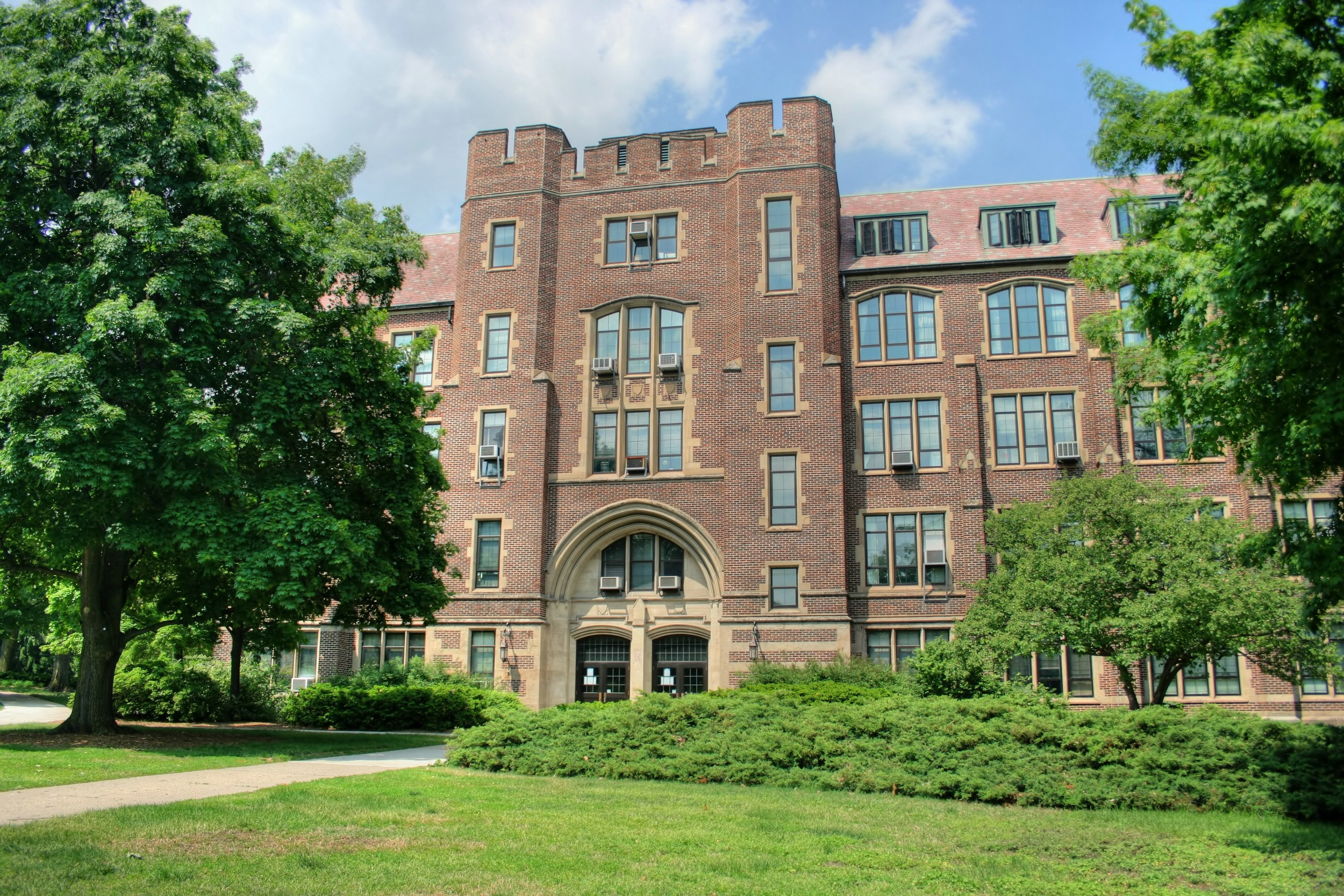
Human Ecology Building

==== College of Law ====
Founded in Detroit in 1891 as the Detroit College of Law, the law school moved to East Lansing in 1995, becoming Michigan State University College of Law. Students attending MSU College of Law come from 42 states and 13 countries. The law school publishes the Michigan State Law Review, the Michigan State Journal of International Law, the Journal of Medicine Law, and the Journal of Business & Securities Law. The College of Law is the home of the Geoffrey Fieger Trial Practice Institute, the first trial practice institute in the United States. In October 2018, MSU's board of trustees voted to fully integrate the College of Law into the university, thereby converting it from a private to a public law school. By August 2020, the College of Law had become fully integrated into the university.

==== Eli Broad College of Business ====
The Eli Broad College of Business has programs in accounting, information systems, finance, general management, human resource management, marketing, supply chain management, and hospitality business. The school has 2,066 admitted undergraduate students and 817 graduate students. The Eli Broad Graduate School of Management, which Businessweek magazine in 2012 ranked 35th in the nation and 14th among public institutions, offers three MBA programs, as well as joint degrees with the College of Law. The opening of the Eugene C. Eppley Center for Graduate Studies in Hotel, Restaurant and Institutional Management brought the first program in the United States to offer a Master of Business Administration degree in Hotel, Restaurant and Institutional Management to MSU.

==== College of Nursing ====
The Michigan State University College of Nursing grants B.S.N., M.S.N., Doctor of Nursing Practice (DNP) and PhD degrees, as well as post-graduate certificates. It was founded in 1950 and has more than 8,600 alumni and is a top 25 NIG-funded nursing college. Additionally, its undergraduate nursing program is ranked No. 28 nationally by U.S. News & World Report. The college's mission focuses on research, education and practice, and it is housed in the Life Sciences Building and Bott Building for Nursing Education and Research on the southeastern part of campus. The college is currently led by Interim Dean Linda S. Weglicki.

==== College of Osteopathic Medicine ====
The Michigan State University College of Osteopathic Medicine was the world's first publicly funded college of osteopathic medicine. It has a long-standing tradition of retaining its alumni in Michigan to practice – more than two-thirds of the college's graduates remain to practice in Michigan.

In 2008, the Michigan State University Board of Trustees approved a resolution endorsing the expansion of the College of Osteopathic Medicine to two sites in southeast Michigan, a move board members and college officials say will not only improve medical education in the state, but also address a projected physician shortage.

In 2025, MSUCOM became the first osteopathic medical school to have its D.O.-Ph.D. program designated as a National Institutes of Health's Medical Scientist Training Program.

According to U.S. News & World Report's 2026 rankings, the College of Osteopathic Medicine (D.O. degree) ranked No. 2 among U.S. medical schools for most graduates practicing in areas with health professional shortages and No. 4 for most graduates practicing in primary care.

==== College of Human Medicine ====
The College of Human Medicine graduates students with a Doctor of Medicine (M.D. degree) and is split into eight distinct campuses located in East Lansing, Flint, Grand Rapids, Midland, Marquette, Traverse City and Southfield. Each campus is affiliated with local hospitals and other medical facilities professionals in the area. For example, the Lansing campus includes Sparrow Hospital and McLaren–Greater Lansing Hospital. The College of Human Medicine has recently gained attention for its expansion into the Grand Rapids area, with the new Secchia Center completed in the Fall of 2010, that is expected to fuel the growing medical industry in that region.

==== College of Health Sciences ====
Under the "One Team, One Health" initiative, Michigan State University is restructuring its health colleges by unifying the College of Human Medicine and the College of Osteopathic Medicine into a single integrated college that will continue to offer both MD and DO degrees under their separate independent accreditations. Additionally, the university is establishing a new College of Health Sciences alongside a cross-cutting One Health Research Network to centralize interdisciplinary research and healthcare workforce training.

==== College of Veterinary Medicine ====
Though Michigan State has offered courses in veterinary science since its founding, the College of Veterinary Medicine was not formally established as a four-year, degree-granting program until 1910. The college has over 170,000 square feet (16,000 m^{2}) of office, teaching, and research space, as well as a veterinary teaching hospital.

The Michigan State University Veterinary Diagnostic Laboratory, a service unit in the College of Veterinary Medicine and member of the National Animal Health Laboratory Network, is a full-service, fully accredited veterinary diagnostic laboratory for all species. Serving livestock, poultry, horses, and wildlife as well as companion, exotic, aquatic and zoo animals, the lab is equipped to give clients easy access to routine and specialty diagnostics.

=== Other academic units ===
In recent years, MSU's music program has grown substantially. Music major enrollment increased more than 97% between 1991 and 2004. In early 2007, this growth led the university board of trustees to spin the music program off into its own college unit: The MSU College of Music. The new college faces many new challenges, such as working with limited space and funding. Nevertheless, MSU's music college plans on continued success, placing an annual average of 25 graduate students in tenure stream university positions.

The College of Education at Michigan State University offers graduate and undergraduate degrees in several fields, including counseling, educational psychology, special education, teacher education and kinesiology. The graduate school has several programs ranked in the top five in the country by U.S. News & World Report for 2016: elementary teacher education (1st), secondary teacher education (1st), curriculum and instruction (3rd), educational psychology (4th), and higher education administration (4th). The College of Education is housed in Erickson Hall. MSU offers a 30 credit graduate program for a Master of Arts in Educational Technology in 3 different formats; completely online, hybrid in East Lansing, or overseas. Founded in 1956, the MSU Honors College provides individualized curricula to MSU's top undergraduate students. Though the college offers no majors of its own, it has its own dean and academic advisers to help Honors students with their educational pursuits. High school students starting at MSU may join the Honors College if they are in the top 5% of their high school graduating class and have an ACT score of at least 30 or an SAT total score of at least 1360. Students can also be admitted after their first semester, generally if they're in the top 10% of their College in GPA. Once admitted, students must maintain a 3.20 GPA and complete eight approved honors courses to graduate with Honors College designation on their degree. If membership is relinquished, it cannot be reclaimed.

After three years of planning, The College of Engineering launched the first stages of its Residential Experience for Spartan Engineering, formally known as the Residential Option for Scientists and Engineers (ROSES). The program was in Wilson Hall after being housed in Bailey Hall for a number of years. The Residential program essentially combines with a brand new academic component, Cornerstone Engineering, where freshman engineering students not only get an overview of the engineering field, but also get a hands-on experience along with it. Global Engineering is a new subject that is of interest for not only the Cornerstone Engineering and Residential Experience programs, but the entire College of Engineering at MSU. Engineering in today's society has shown to have a monumental impact on the global economy due to advancements in education, as well as interdependence on economics with infrastructure, computers, transportation, technology and other manufactured goods. The newly established Cornerstone Engineering and Residential Experience (CoRe) program in the College of Engineering has started programs abroad for more courses in engineering, including study abroad seminars. In 2014, the Detroit Free Press published an article referencing Michigan State University's Recruiting Trends 2014–15 report, which ranked engineering among the top 20 college degrees with the highest starting salaries.

MSU's original mission as an agricultural college continues today in the College of Agriculture & Natural Resources.

== Athletics ==
Michigan State's NCAA Division I-A program offers 11 varsity sports for men and 12 for women. Their teams are called the Spartans, they use the schools colors of green and white, and their mascot is a Spartan warrior named Sparty. The university participates in the Big Ten Conference in all varsity sports. Michigan State has multiple national championships in football, men's basketball, ice hockey, and cross country. The football team has won several Big Ten titles and appeared in the College Football Playoff in 2015. The men's basketball program, led for decades by head coach Tom Izzo, has won multiple Big Ten championships and has made 28 straight NCAA tournament appearances, including numerous Final Fours and two NCAA national titles (1979, 2000).

Spartan women's athletics have achieved significant success in multiple sports. The women's basketball team has won multiple Big Ten championships and made several deep NCAA Tournament runs, including a Final Four appearance in 2005. In 2014, women's cross country was named national champions. Other programs, such as women's soccer, gymnastics, and volleyball, have also earned conference titles and NCAA tournament appearances.

In 1888 Michigan State University (then known as Michigan State Agricultural College) along with Olivet, Albion and Hillsdale Colleges was a founding member of the nation's oldest athletic conference, the Michigan Intercollegiate Athletic Association (MIAA). MAC left the conference in 1907.

=== Football ===
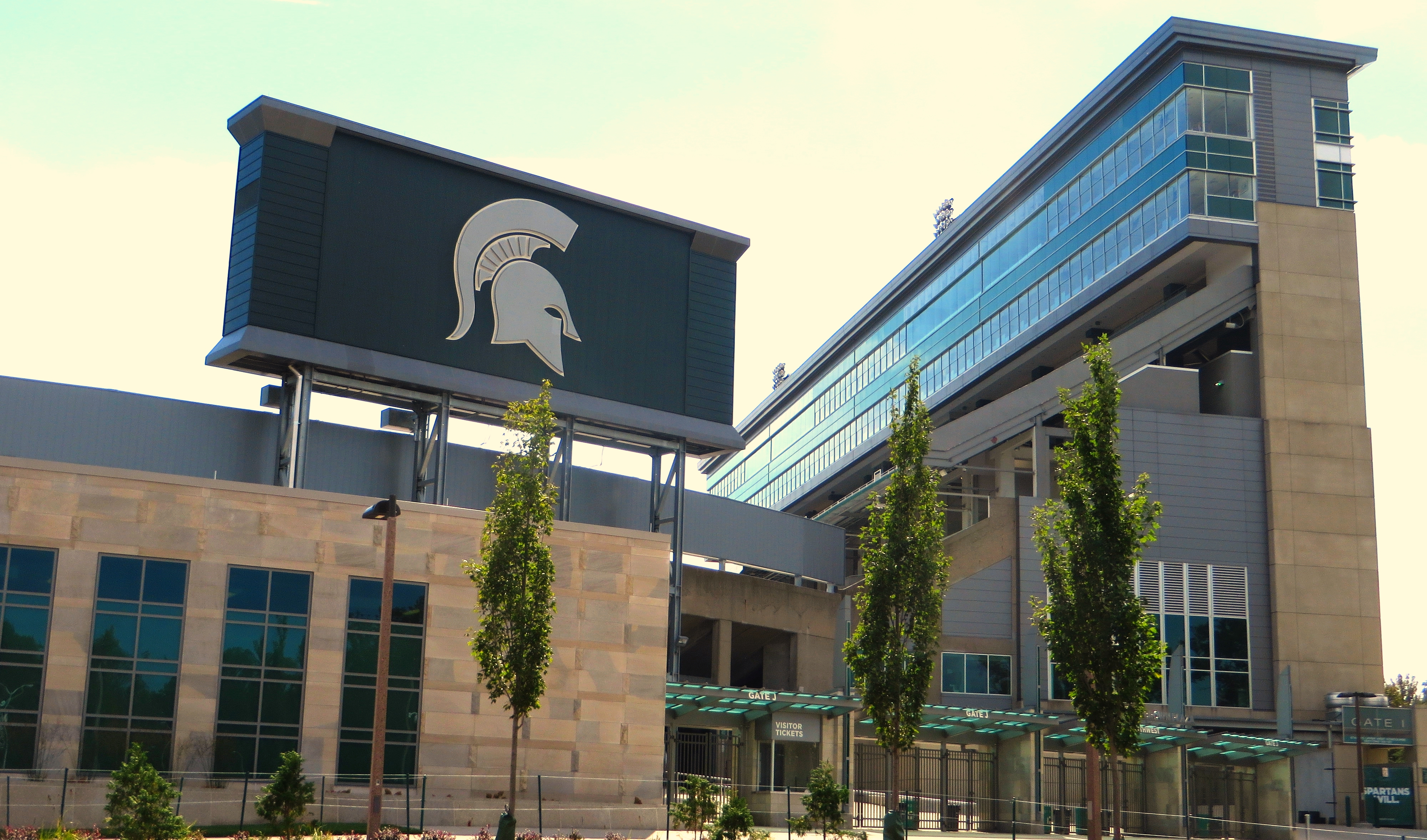
Spartan Stadium hosts varsity football games and other events.

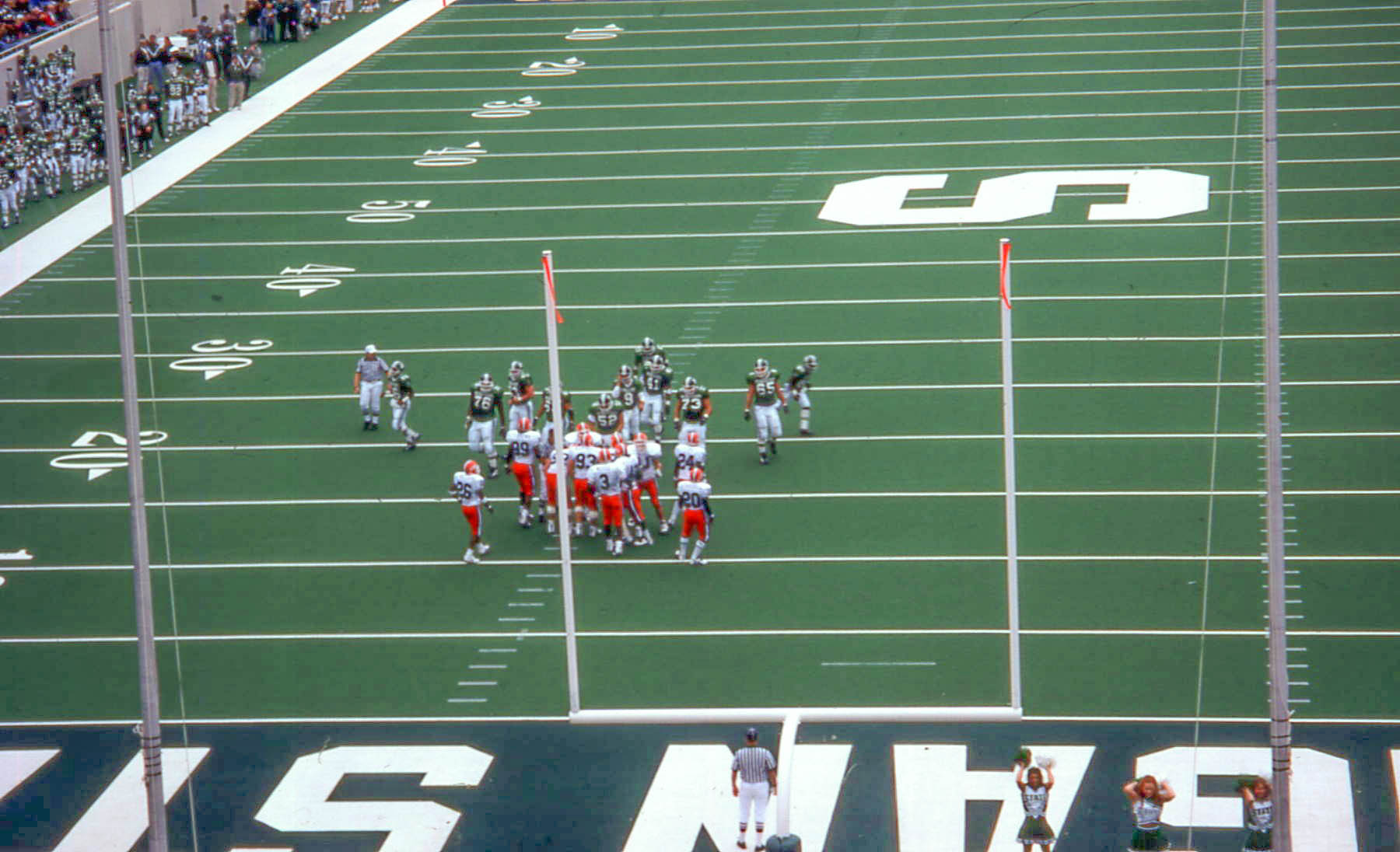
The Spartans playing the Illinois Fighting Illini in an October 1996 game at Spartan Stadium

Football has a long tradition at Michigan State. Starting as a club sport in 1884, football gained varsity status in 1896. The Spartans won the Rose Bowl in 1954, 1956, 1988, and 2014. They won national championships in 1951, 1952, 1955, 1957, 1965 and 1966. The Spartans accounted for four of the top eight selections in the 1967 NFL/AFL draft, the only time a college football program has accomplished such a feat. As of 2020, MSU was one of only four schools to have at least one player selected in every NFL draft in the common draft era, starting in 1967. The 2021 NFL Draft marked the first time since 1941 that no Michigan State players were selected.

=== Men's basketball ===
MSU's men's basketball team has won the National Championship twice: in 1979 and again in 2000. The team has made 28 straight NCAA tournament appearances under head coach Tom Izzo. The Spartans play at the Jack Breslin Student Events Center.

=== Men's ice hockey ===
The Michigan State University men's ice hockey team started in 1924, though it has been a varsity sport only since 1950. The team won national titles in 1966, 1986 and 2007. The Spartans came close to repeating the national title in 1987, but lost the championship game to the North Dakota Fighting Hawks. They play at MSU's Munn Ice Arena. Former head coach Ron Mason is college hockey's winningest coach, with 924 wins total and 635 at MSU. The current head coach is Adam Nightingale. The men's ice hockey team competes in the Big Ten conference. They formerly competed in the Central Collegiate Hockey Association. Michigan State leads the CCHA in all-time wins, is second in CCHA Conference championships, with seven, and is first in CCHA Tournament Championships, with 11. As with other sports, the hockey rivalry between the Spartans and the Michigan Wolverines is a fierce one, and on October 6, 2001, the Spartans faced the Wolverines in the Cold War, during which a world record crowd of 74,554 packed Spartan Stadium to watch the game end in a 3–3 tie. In the 2006–2007 season, the men's ice hockey team defeated Boston College for its third NCAA hockey championship.

=== Men's cross country ===
Between World War I and World War II, Michigan State College competed in the Central Collegiate Conference, winning titles in 1926–1929, 1932, 1933 and 1935. Michigan State also experienced success in the IC4A, at New York's Van Cortlandt Park, winning 15 team titles (1933–1937, 1949, 1953, 1956–1960, 1962, 1963 and 1968). Since entering the Big Ten in 1950, Michigan State has won 14 men's team titles (1951–1953, 1955–1960, 1962, 1963, 1968, 1970 and 1971). Michigan State hosted the inaugural NCAA cross country championships in 1938 and every year thereafter through 1964 (there was no championship in 1943). The Spartans won NCAA championships in 1939, 1948, 1949, 1952, 1955, 1956, 1958 and 1959.

=== Wrestling ===
MSU Spartan Wrestling won their only team NCAA Championship in 1967. The current Spartans Head coach is Roger Chandler in his second season. The team competes on campus at the Jenison Field House. Spartan Wrestling has over 50 Big Ten Conference Champions, over 100 All-Americans, and 11 individual wrestlers have NCAA Division I Wrestling Championships. Notable former Spartan wrestlers include Rashad Evans and Gray Maynard.

== Student life ==
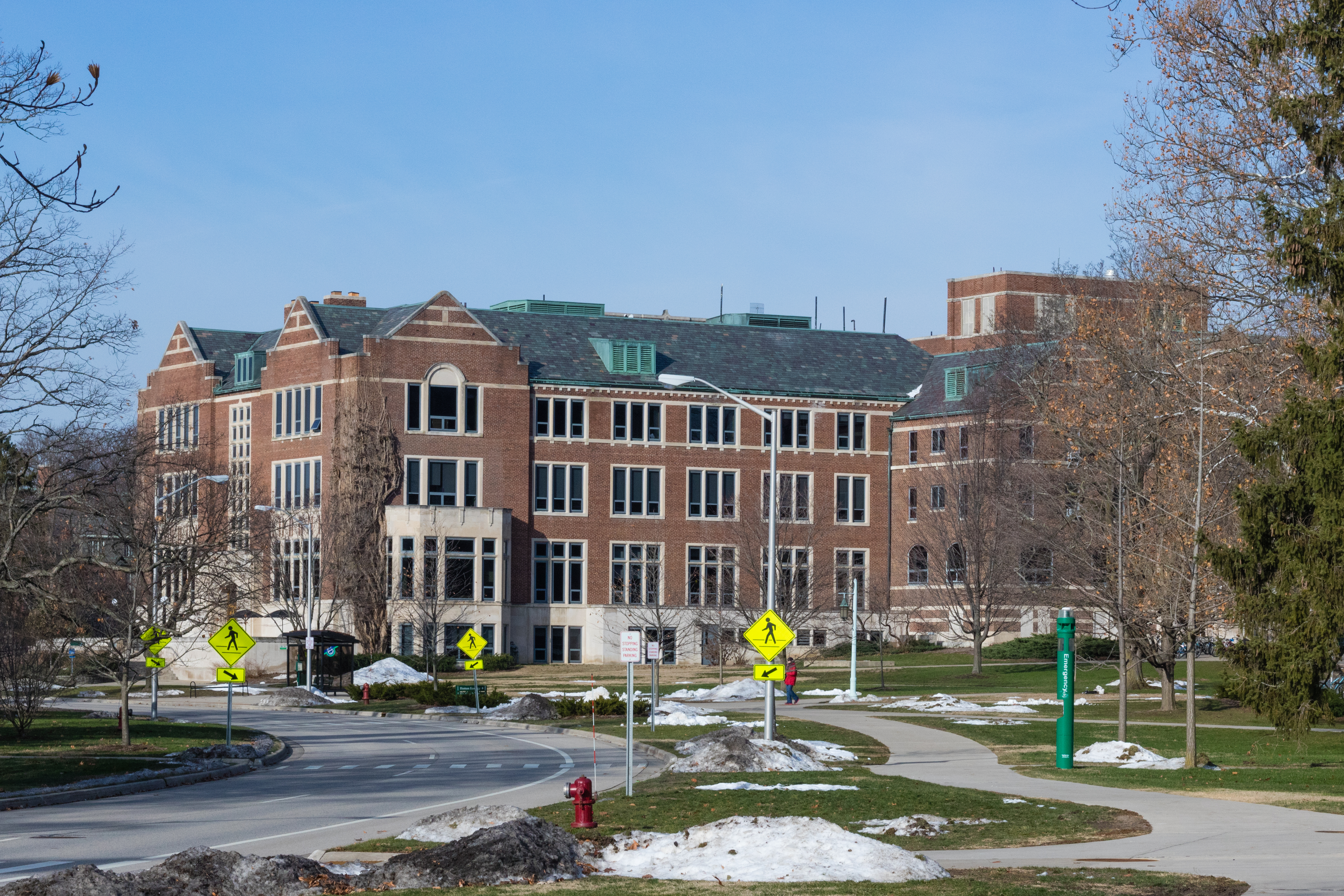
The MSU Union is home to many events on campus.

East Lansing is very much a college town, with 63.5% of the population between the ages of 15 and 24. President John A. Hannah's push to expand in the 1950s and 1960s resulted in the largest residence hall system in the United States. Around 16,000 students live in MSU's 23 undergraduate halls, one graduate hall, and three apartment villages. Each residence hall has its own hall government, with representatives in the Residence Halls Association. Yet despite the size and extent of on-campus housing, the residence halls are complemented by a variety of housing options. 58% of students live off-campus, mostly in the areas closest to campus, in either apartment buildings, former single-family homes, fraternity and sorority houses, or in a co-op.

In 2014 there were approximately 50,085 students, 38,786 undergraduate and 11,299 graduate and professional. The students are from all 50 states and 130 countries around the world.

=== Student body ===
Student body composition as of May 2, 2022
Race and ethnicity	Total
White	68%
Black	8%
Foreign national	7%
Asian	7%
Hispanic	6%
Other (Note: Other consists of multiracial Americans & those who prefer to not say.)	5%
Economic diversity
Pell grant recipients	22%

MSU tied for tenth place among universities with the largest student enrollment in the U.S. for fall 2018. For the fiscal year of 2018–19, the Office of the Registrar conferred 12,354 degrees. The student body is 52% female and 48% male. While 75.1% of students come from all 83 counties in the State of Michigan, also represented are all 50 states in the U.S. and 138 other countries.

==== International engagement ====
In fall 2019, 5,660 international students enrolled at MSU, with the top five countries outside North America being China (2,965), India (506), South Korea (331), Saudi Arabia (222) and Taiwan (144). MSU's study abroad program included 2,805 total students in the 2017–2018 academic year, with 2,755 of those being MSU students. Based on 2017–2018 numbers, MSU studied abroad in over 60 countries on all continents, including Antarctica.

According to a Brookings Institution report analyzing foreign student visa approvals from 2008 to 2012, MSU once enrolled the highest number of Chinese international students in the United States, with roughly 4,700 Chinese citizens enrolled during the period of the study. MSU later saw decreased Chinese enrollment and lost its status as the top destination of Chinese students, which former Michigan Department of Education head Tom Watkins attributed to a ramp-up in anti-China rhetoric by then-president Donald Trump and changes in Chinese domestic conditions. MSU saw a roughly 25 percent drop in overall international enrollment in the first full academic year of the COVID-19 pandemic, but numbers had begun to rebound by the fall of 2021, with university officials expecting a full recovery by the 2022–2023 academic year.

Amid the fall of Kabul in August 2021, MSU, in concert with US Representative Elissa Slotkin, facilitated the evacuation of over 70 staff, scholars, and their families related to an MSU-USAID collaborative program in Afghanistan. Twelve of the Afghan evacuees attached to this program were students in the university's Grain Research and Innovation (GRAIN) project, hosted by Kabul University. Bypassing typical financial review procedures, university officials paid $250,000 on a university credit card for the emergency charter of an airplane to reunite evacuees in Albania. MSU facilitated the students' transfer to the Agricultural University of Tirana and then assisted in humanitarian parole into the United States in early 2022.

In February 2023, the Chinese Consulate-General in Chicago announced that two Chinese MSU students had been wounded in the 2023 Michigan State University shooting. Based on 2021 enrollment data from the university's international office, China was still likely the largest source of international students for MSU at the time of the shooting.

=== Fraternities and sororities ===
With over 3,000 members, Michigan State University's Greek Community is one of the largest in the US. Started in 1872 and re-established in 1922 by Lambda Chi Alpha fraternity, Alpha Gamma Rho fraternity, and Alpha Phi sorority; the MSU Greek system now consists of 55 Greek lettered student societies. These chapters are in turn under the jurisdiction of one of MSU's four Greek governing councils: National Panhellenic Conference, North American Interfraternity Council, National Pan-Hellenic Council, and Independent Greek Council. National Pan-Hellenic Council is made up of nine organizations, five fraternities and four sororities. The Interfraternity Council and the Women's Panhellenic Council are each entirely responsible for their own budgets, giving them the freedom to hold large fundraising and recruitment events. MSU's fraternities and sororities hold many philanthropy events and community fundraisers. For example, in April 2011 the Greek Community held Greek Week to raise over $260,000 for the American Cancer Society, and $5,000 for each of these charities: Big Brothers Big Sisters, The Listening Ear and previous charities include: the Make-a-Wish Foundation (MSU Chapter), Share Laura's Hope, The Mary Beth Knox Scholarship, and the Special Olympics, in which fraternity and sorority members help each other participate.

=== Student organizations ===
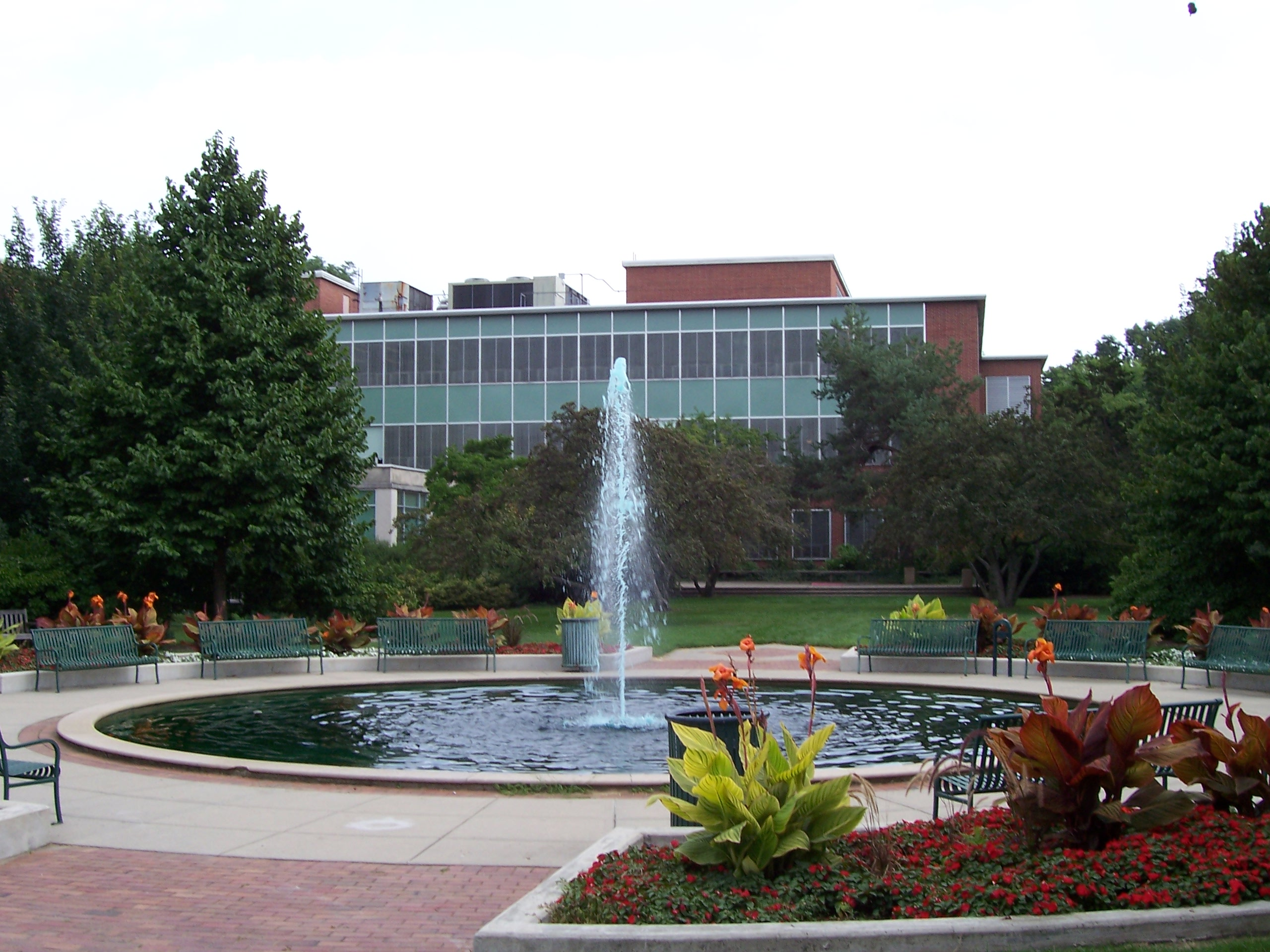
The Student Services Building houses the MSU Division of Student Affairs, as well as ASMSU and the Greek governing councils.

The Associated Students of Michigan State University (ASMSU) is the all-university undergraduate student government of Michigan State University. It was unusual among university student governments for its decentralized bicameral structure, and the relatively non-existent influence of the Greek system. The structure has since changed to a single General Assembly as part of reorganization in the late 2000s. ASMSU representatives are nonpartisan and many are elected in noncompetitive races. Some services they offer include free blue books, low-cost copies and printing, free yearbooks, interest free loans, funding for student organizations, free legal consultation, and iClicker and graphing calculator rentals.

Students pay $21 per semester to fund the functions of the ASMSU, including stipends for the organization's officers and activities throughout the year. Some students have criticized ASMSU for not having enough electoral participation to gain a student mandate. Turnout since 2001 has hovered between 3 and 17 percent, with the 2006 election bringing out 8% of the undergraduate student body.

Student-run organizations beyond student government also have a large impact on the East Lansing/Michigan State University community. Student Organizations are registered through the Department of Student Life, which currently has a registry of over 800 student organizations.

The Eli Broad College of Business includes 27 student organizations of primary interest to business students. The three largest organizations are the Finance Association (FA), the Accounting Student Association (ASA), and the Supply Chain Management Association (SCMA). The SCMA is the host of the university's largest major specific career fair. The fair attracts over 100 companies and over 400 students each year.

=== Activism ===
Activists have played a significant role in MSU history. During the height of the Vietnam War, student protests helped create co-ed residence halls, and blocked the routing of Interstate 496 through campus. In the 1980s, Michigan State students convinced the university to divest the stocks of companies doing business in apartheid South Africa from its endowment portfolio, such as Coca-Cola. In 2011, a student group staged a large sit-in protest in the university President's office as the culmination of multiple years of attempting to convince the administration to transition from coal energy production to 100% clean energy. In 2019, Michigan Governor Gretchen Whitmer joined the Lansing Women's March, standing with victims of sexual assault on campus. Following the February 13 shooting on campus which killed three students, a student group organized a peaceful protest on the steps of the Michigan State Capitol. This protest quickly led to new gun control bills being passed within the Michigan state legislature.

MSU has many student groups focused on political change. Graduate campus groups include the Graduate Employees Union and the Council of Graduate Students.

=== Sustainability ===
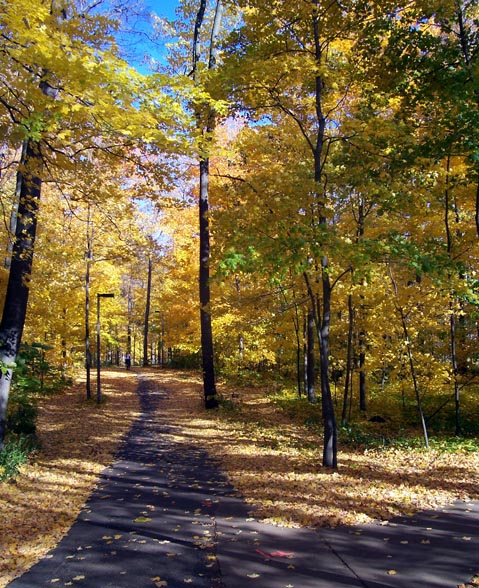
MSU's campus is heavily forested. This trail runs behind several residence halls, including Owen Hall, McDonel Hall and Holmes Hall.

The MSU Office of Sustainability works with the University Committee for a Sustainable Campus to "foster a collaborative learning culture that leads the community to heightened awareness of its environmental impact." The university is a member of the Chicago Climate Exchange, the world's first greenhouse gas emission registry, and boasts the lowest electrical consumption per square foot among Big Ten universities. The university has set a goal of reducing energy use by 15%, reducing greenhouse gas emissions by 15%, reducing landfill waste by 30% by 2015.

The university has also pledged to meet LEED-certification standards for all new construction. In July 2009, the university completed construction of a $13.3 million recycling center, and hopes to double their 2008 recycling rate of 14% by 2010. The construction of Brody Hall, a residence hall of Michigan State University Housing, was completed in August 2011 and qualified for LEED Silver certification because the facility includes a rain water collection tank used for restroom fixtures, a white PVC roof, meters that will monitor utilities to make sure they are used efficiently, and the use of recycled matter and local sources for building materials.

The Environmental Steward's program support's president Simon's "Boldness by Design" strategic vision to transform environmental stewardship on campus within the seven-year time frame. Environmental stewards promote environmental changes among co-workers and peers, be points of contact for their department for environment-related concerns, and be liaisons between the Be Spartan Green Team and buildings.

The Student Organic Farm is a student-run, four-season farm, which teaches the principals of organic farming and through a certificate program and community-supported agriculture (CSA) on ten acres on the MSU campus. The certificate program consists of year-round crop production, course work in organic farming, practical training and management, and an off-site internship requirement.

=== Media ===
MSU has a variety of campus media outlets. The student-run newspaper is The State News and free copies are available online or at East Lansing newsstands. The paper prints 28,500 copies from Monday through Friday during the fall and spring semesters, and 15,000 copies Monday through Friday during the summer. The paper is not published on weekends, holidays, or semester breaks, but is continually updated online at statenews.com. The campus yearbook is called the Red Cedar Log.

Red Cedar Review, Michigan State University's premier literary digest for over forty years, is the longest running undergraduate-run literary journal in the United States. It is published annually by the Michigan State University Press.

Michigan State Journal of History, an undergraduate-operated journal, features undergraduate scholarship at the university, and "strives to reflect the intellectual climate fostered by the Department of History".

MSU also publishes a student-run magazine during the academic year called Ing Magazine. Created in 2007 by MSU alumnus Adam Grant, the publication is released at the beginning of each month and publishes seven issues each school year. MSU also publishes a student-run fashion and lifestyle magazine called VIM Magazine once a semester.

Electronic media include three radio stations and one public television station, as well as student-produced television shows. MSU's Public Broadcasting Service affiliate, WKAR-TV, the station is the second-oldest educational television station in the United States, and the oldest east of the Mississippi River. Besides broadcasting PBS shows, WKAR-TV produces its own local programming, such as a high school quiz bowl show called QuizBusters. In addition, MSU has three radio stations; WKAR-AM plays National Public Radio's talk radio programming, whereas WKAR-FM focuses mostly on classical music programming. Michigan State's student-run radio station, WDBM, broadcasts mostly alternative music during weekdays and electric music programming nights and weekends in addition to sports broadcasting, news reporting, producing podcasts, and organizing on-campus concerts.

=== Safety ===
Violent crime is rare on the campus, but similar to other major universities, there have been several significant incidents.

==== Agriculture Hall arson ====
In a 1999 incident, eco-anarchist activists, including Rod Coronado, burned down part of Agriculture Hall, with four additional suspects being arrested and charged nearly a decade later, in 2008. It was the second case of domestic eco-terrorism at MSU resulting in indictments. In 1992, arsonists attacked the offices of two faculty members in Anthony Hall and vandalized campus mink research facilities.

==== Sexual assault investigation ====
On May 1, 2014, Michigan State University was named one of 55 higher education institutions under investigation by the Office of Civil Rights "for possible violations of federal law over the handling of sexual violence and harassment complaints" by President Barack Obama's White House Task Force To Protect Students from Sexual Assault. "The investigation at Michigan State involves its response to sexual harassment and sexual assault complaints involving students," according to one reporter. It was later reported in the same paper that "An investigation by the U.S. Department of Education into how Michigan State University handles sexual assault complaints was spurred by an incident in Wonders Hall in August 2010," a spokesman said.

==== USA Gymnastics sex abuse scandal ====
In 2016, a police report was filed alleging that in 2000, USA Gymnastics team doctor and MSU physician Larry Nassar (also a professor in the MSU College of Human Medicine) had sexually assaulted a minor named Rachael Denhollander under the guise of medical treatment. The allegation and allegations of physical abuse by others led to the arrest and eventual conviction of Nassar. A federal court sentenced him in 2017 and state courts in 2018. Between the police report filing and the time of sentencing, 156 victims, including Olympic gymnasts and MSU student athletes, came forward to speak of abuses inflicted by Nassar. The Detroit News reported that 14 MSU representatives—including athletic trainers, coaches, a university police detective, and administrators—had possibly been alerted of sexual misconduct by Nassar across two decades, with notification of an incident in 2014 documented by a Title IX investigation. Michigan State and USA Gymnastics have been accused of enabling Nassar's abuse and are named as defendants in civil lawsuits that gymnasts and former MSU student athletes have filed against Nassar. On May 16, 2018, it was announced that Michigan State University had agreed to pay the victims of Nassar $500 million, equivalent to $641 million in 2025.

MSU's role in the scandal, as well as mounting pressure from the public and alumni, led to several high-level staff changes, including the resignation of President Lou Anna Simon in January 2018, as well as the retirement of athletic director Mark Hollis and gymnastics coach Kathie Klages. Former Michigan Governor John Engler replaced Simon as interim president of the university, but resigned in January 2019 after a pattern of controversial comments about the ongoing scandal including that Nassar's victims were "enjoying" the spotlight and being credibly accused of trying to bribe a victim in to silence. In addition, several conspirators saw charges brought against them:

- March 2018 - William Strampel was arrested and charged with felony misconduct in office and criminal sexual conduct for allegedly groping a student and storing nude photos of female students on his computer. Strampel was the former dean of the College of Osteopathic Medicine and oversaw Larry Nassar's clinic.
- August 2018 - former coach Klages was charged with two counts of lying to police regarding knowledge of Nassar's sexual abuse.
- November 2018 - former university president Simon was charged with two felonies and two misdemeanor counts for lying to the police about her knowledge of sexual abuse committed by Nassar.
- June 2019 - former dean Strampel was convicted of one count of felony misconduct in office and two counts of misdemeanor willful neglect of duty.

Strample was sentenced in August 2019 to one 11-month term and two one-year terms in county jail, with the sentences to run concurrently.

In February 2020, former coach Klages was found guilty on the charges of lying to police. A judge dismissed the criminal case against former president Simon in May 2020. In June, the Michigan attorney general appealed to reinstate the charges.

==== 2021 hazing death ====
On November 20, 2021, Phat Nguyen died during an off-campus hazing incident in Pi Alpha Phi fraternity. The 21-year-old fraternity pledge and three other pledges were found unresponsive at 2 a.m. and transported to the local hospital. Despite performing cardiopulmonary resuscitation on Nguyen, firefighters were unable to save him. The fraternity chapter was banned by the university and the national fraternity.

==== 2023 mass shooting ====
On February 13, 2023, a mass shooting occurred on campus that resulted in three killed and five injured before the gunman killed himself. Police have yet to identify a motive. Classes were canceled for one week following the shooting, and several student-led protests supporting gun control legislation were held at the Michigan State Capitol in the week t

hat followed.

== Governance ==
=== Board of Trustees ===
The university is governed by the trustees of Michigan State University, a body of eight elected constitutional officers of the state of Michigan. They are elected in statewide, partisan elections in even-numbered years (two per year) and serve eight-year terms without compensation, like the regents of the University of Michigan and the governors of Wayne State University. The board selects the university president who serves ex officio as the ninth, non-voting member of the board.

== Investment office ==
The Michigan State University Investment Office oversees the management of the university's endowment. Its investment strategy aims to support long-term growth while mitigating risks that market fluctuations bring. The office was created in 2016 to centralize the university's investment operations. It was led in 2024 by Philip Zecher, who oversaw the selection of external fund managers and ensured adherence to the university's investment policy. It is located on the university's campus at 426 Auditorium Road, Room 412.

== People ==
MSU has about 5,703 faculty and 7,365 staff members.

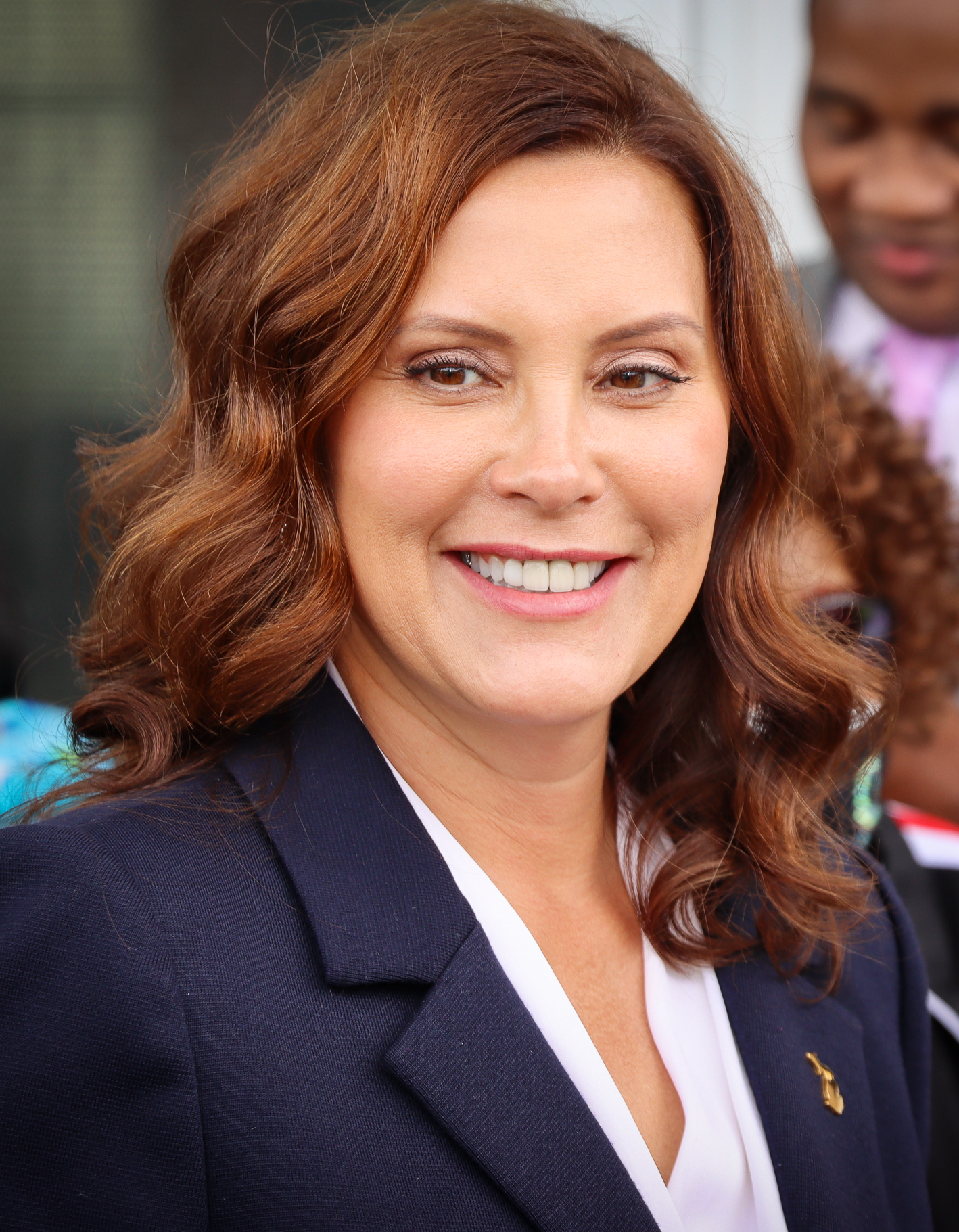
49th governor of Michigan Gretchen Whitmer

=== Faculty ===
Important college leaders in the 19th century include John C. Holmes, the founder; Joseph R. Williams, the first president, and Theophilus C. Abbot, the third president who stabilized the college after the Civil War, were both key in establishing and maintaining the college's early balanced liberal/practical curriculum. Also of importance was botany professor William J. Beal, an early plant (hybrid corn) pre-geneticist who championed the laboratory teaching method. Another distinguished faculty member of the era was the alumnus/professor Liberty Hyde Bailey. Bailey was the first to raise the study of horticulture to a science, paralleling botany, which earned him the title of "father of American horticulture". William L. Carpenter, a jurist who was elected to the Third Judicial Circuit of Michigan in 1894, and member of the Michigan Supreme Court from 1902 until 1904. Other famous 19th-century alumni include Ray Stannard Baker, a famed "muckraker" journalist and Pulitzer Prize winning biographer; Minakata Kumagusu, a renowned environmental scientist; and William Chandler Bagley, a pioneering education reformer.

=== Alumni ===
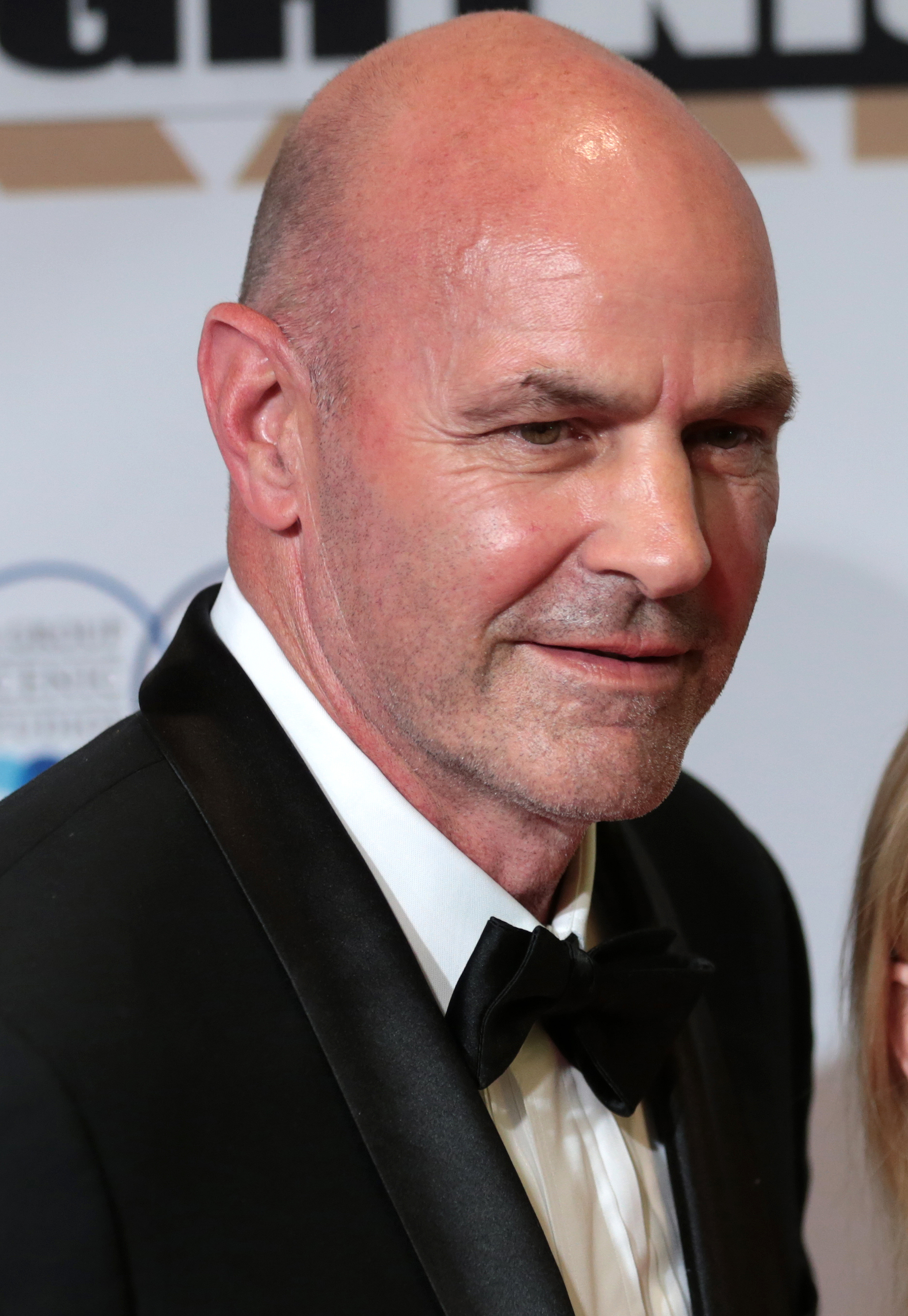
Kirk Gibson, 1988 National League MVP

As of the fall of 2018, there were about 634,300 living MSU alumni worldwide. Notable politicians and public servants from MSU include current governor of Michigan Gretchen Whitmer, former Michigan governors James Blanchard and John Engler, U.S. senators Debbie Stabenow, Tim Johnson, and Spencer Abraham, (who also served as Secretary of Energy), U.S. Ambassador to Brazil Donna Hrinak, former Prime Minister of South Korea Lee Wan-koo, Consumer Financial Protection Bureau Director Richard Cordray, former Jordan prime minister Adnan Badran, and Chief Justice of the Texas Supreme Court Wallace B. Jefferson. Billionaire philanthropists Tom Gores, Andrew Beal and Eli Broad, Pulitzer Prize-winning novelist Richard Ford, American labor union leader James P. Hoffa, and Quicken Loans founder and billionaire Cleveland Cavaliers owner Dan Gilbert, are all also MSU alums.

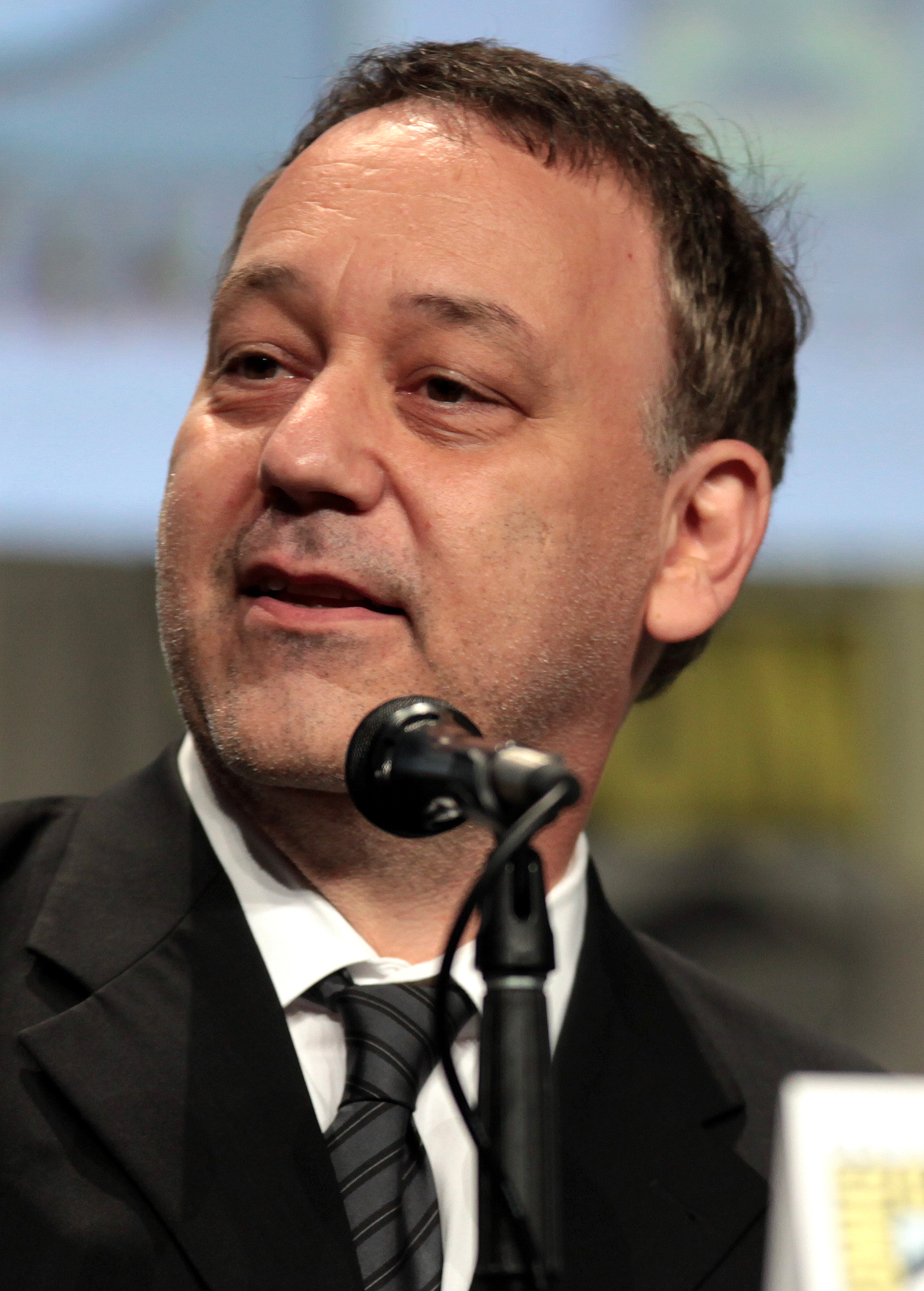
Filmmaker Sam Raimi

Alumni in Hollywood include actors such as James Caan, Anthony Heald, Robert Urich and William Fawcett; voice actor SungWon Cho, comedian Jackie Martling, film directors Michael Cimino and Sam Raimi, film producer Jeff Katz and film editor Bob Murawski, as well as screenwriter David Magee.

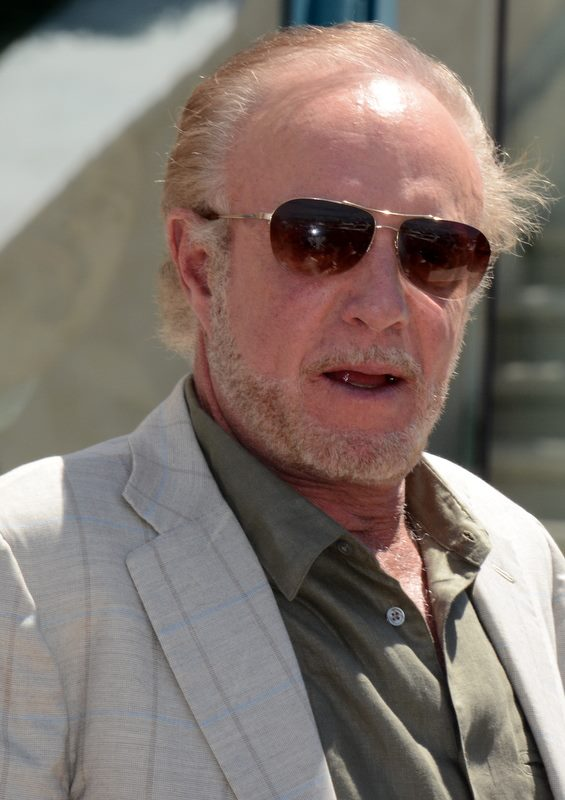
Hollywood actor James Caan

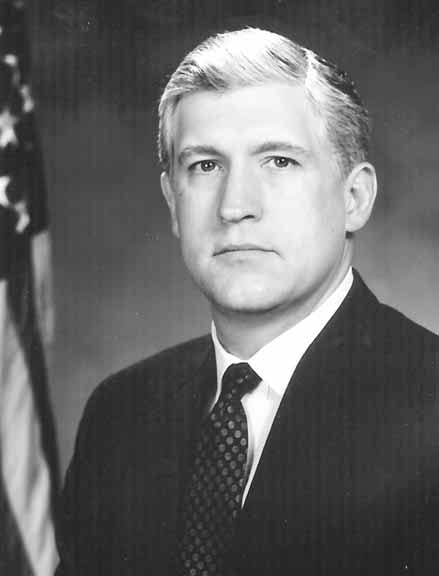
18th Director of the United States Secret Service Eljay Bowron

Composer Dika Newlin received her undergraduate degree from MSU, while lyricist, theatrical director and clinical psychologist Jacques Levy earned a doctorate in psychology. The university has also produced such jazz luminaries as pianist Henry Butler, vibraphonist Milt Jackson, and keyboardist/composer-arranger Clare Fischer. Post-emo band Hot Mulligan began at Michigan State University, where Chris Freeman and Nathan "Tades" Sanville met Ryan "Spicy" Malicsi and Brandon Blakely.

Russell Kirk, whose writings influenced the American conservative movement, attended Michigan State on a scholarship for his bachelor's degree. Journalists include NBC reporter Chris Hansen, ESPN sportcaster and columnist Jemele Hill, AP White House correspondent Nedra Pickler and NPR Washington correspondent Don Gonyea. Novelist Michael Kimball graduated in 1990. Novelist and true crime author R. Barri Flowers, who in 1977 earned a bachelor's degree and in 1980 a master's degree in criminal justice, was inducted in 2006 into the MSU Criminal Justice Wall of Fame. Author Erik Qualman graduated with honors in 1994 and was also Academic Big-Ten in basketball. Susan K. Avery, the first female president and director of the Woods Hole Oceanographic Institution, received an MSU bachelor's degree in physics. In addition, two of the Little Rock Nine attended Michigan State, including Ernest Green, the first black student to graduate from Little Rock Central High School, and Carlotta Walls LaNier. The university awarded an honorary degree to Robert Mugabe in 1990, but revoked it in 2008.

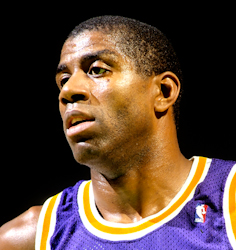
Magic Johnson, Naismith Memorial Basketball Hall of Fame inductee

Spartans have made their mark in all major American sports. MSU alumni formerly or currently in the NBA include point guard and three-time MVP Earvin "Magic" Johnson, Draymond Green, Greg Kelser, Jay Vincent, Steve Smith, Scott Skiles, Jason Richardson, and Zach Randolph.

In the National Football League, MSU alumni include Carl Banks, who was a member of the Giants teams that won Super Bowls XXI and XXV and a member of the NFL's 1980's All-Decade Team; twenty-one year veteran quarterback Earl Morrall, defensive end and actor Bubba Smith, former Detroit Lions head coach Wayne Fontes, and NFL games-played leader Morten Andersen. The American Football League's All-Time Team includes tight-end Fred Arbanas and safety George Saimes.

Former Michigan State players in the National Hockey League include All Star Defensemen Duncan Keith, Rod Brind'Amour, Anson Carter, Donald McSween, Adam Hall, John-Michael Liles, Justin Abdelkader, Corey Tropp, brothers Kelly Miller and Kip Miller, as well as their cousins, brothers Ryan Miller and Drew Miller.

Former Michigan State players in Major League Baseball include Hall of Fame inductee Robin Roberts, Kirk Gibson, Steve Garvey and Mark Mulder. Olympic gold medalists include Savatheda Fynes and Fred Alderman. The Spartans are also contributing athletes to Major League Soccer, as Doug DeMartin, Dave Hertel, Greg Janicki, Rauwshan McKenzie, Ryan McMahen, and Fatai Alashe have all played in Major League Soccer. Alex Skotarek, Steve Twellman and Buzz Demling played in the North American Soccer League, with Demling playing in the 1972 Summer Olympics and the United States Men's National Soccer Team in the 1970s.

Ryan Riess, 2013 World Series of Poker Main Event Champion, is a 2012 graduate of MSU. NCAA Gymnastics Champion and former Sesame Street Muppet performer Toby Towson are MSU alumni as is professional wrestler George "The Animal" Steele.

Miss America 1961, Nancy Fleming, is a graduate of Michigan State.

Verghese Kurien was an Indian social entrepreneur known as the "father of the White Revolution" for his Operation Flood, the world's largest agricultural development program. He earned a Master of Science in Metallurgical Engineering from Michigan State University in 1948. Peter Schmidt, an economist and econometrician, is both an alumnus (1970) and faculty member of MSU, holding a university Distinguished Professor position since 1997.

== See also ==
- List of land-grant universities
- List of colleges and universities in Michigan
- Education in Michigan
- Michigan State University Spartan Marching Band
