= College Hall (Michigan State University) =

Building

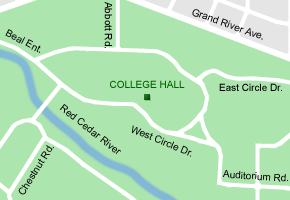
- College Hall's former location on campus
- Interactive map of the College Hall area

General information
- Type: Classroom, office, laboratory, library, and chapel space
- Architectural style: Eclectic
- Location: Sacred Space, Michigan State University
- Coordinates: 42.732°N 84.4823°W
- Completed: 1856
- Demolished: 1918 (collapse from shoddy construction)

Design and construction
- Architect: John Clough Holmes

Website
- Beaumont Tower website

College Hall was the first building erected on the campus of the Agricultural College of the State of Michigan (now Michigan State University), and the first in the United States to be erected "for the teaching of scientific agriculture." Reputedly designed by John C. Holmes, it was built in 1856 and housed the school's classrooms, offices and laboratories, the school's library/museum, and a multifunction lecture hall/chapel. Along with Saints' Rest, and a horse barn, it was one of three buildings completed when the college opened for classes in 1857.

By the turn of the 20th century, College Hall had outlived its usefulness, and its future was in doubt. Because Michigan state government officials had taken the lowest construction bid possible, College Hall suffered from an extraordinary number of construction defects. These included hollow bricks, doors that would not open, a leaky roof (replaced by student labour in the first year), soft pine floorboards that shrank so they did not reach the walls, and even a tree stump embedded in the foundation. The College considered demolishing the historic edifice, but students organized a campaign to save it from the wrecking ball. They convinced the college to convert the hall into a student union.

The college went forward with plans to save the structurally unsound building, but it was beyond preservation. The renovation weakened the shoddily built structure, and in August 1918, the building collapsed while a marching band played "The Star-Spangled Banner" outside the building. No one was injured in the collapse. After the College cleared away the debris, they entertained several proposals to replace College Hall, but in the end they erected a clock tower on the northeast corner of the site. Beaumont Tower became the new architectural symbol of Michigan State College. Nevertheless, College Hall was not forgotten; to this day it is featured on the great seal of Michigan State University.
