= Saints' Rest =

Building at the Agricultural College of the State of Michigan

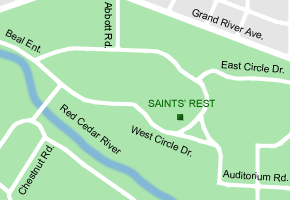
- Saints Rest's former location on campus.

General information
- Type: Dormitory
- Architectural style: Eclectic
- Location: Sacred Space; Michigan State University
- Named for: The Saints' Everlasting Rest (1650 hymnal) by Richard Baxter
- Completed: 1856
- Demolished: 1876 (fire); Excavated in 2005

Design and construction
- Architect: John Clough Holmes

Website
- Dig MSU

Saints' Rest was the second building erected on the campus of the Agricultural College of the State of Michigan (now Michigan State University). It was built in 1856 and served as the school's only dormitory until 1870, when Williams Hall was completed. Along with College Hall and a horse barn, it was one of three buildings completed when the college opened for classes in 1857.

As the campus's only residence hall, the building had no official name. Students had a variety of nicknames for it including "the hall", "the boarding hall", "old hall", or "the house". It was only after the hall burned that it acquired the moniker "Saints' Rest", which came from the Puritan devotional The Saints' Everlasting Rest, written by Richard Baxter in 1650.

The hall burned down during the December 1876 vacation despite the efforts of the Lansing fire department, which made the run all the way from Lansing in only 45 minutes.

On June 6, 2005, a team of Michigan State archeology professors and students began a six-week excavation on the site. The dig was part of MSU's 2005 sesquicentennial celebration.
