= WVIC =

WVIC may refer to:

- Wisconsin Valley Improvement Company, manager of dammed reservoirs in Wisconsin
- WVIC-LP, a low-power radio station (99.1 FM) licensed to serve Saint Paul, Minnesota, United States
- WVFN, a radio station licensed to East Lansing, Michigan, which held the call sign WVIC from 1965 to 1981
- WMMQ, a radio station licensed to East Lansing, Michigan, which held the call sign WVIC or WVIC-FM from 1983 to 1997
- WLMI, a radio station licensed to Grand Ledge, Michigan, which held the call sign WVIC from 1997 to 2001
- WWDK, a radio station licensed to Jackson, Michigan, which held the call sign WVIC from 2001 to 2015
- WKCJ, a radio station (93.3 FM) licensed to serve White Sulphur Spring, West Virginia, United States, which held the call sign WVIC from 2015 to 2016
