= WWSJ =

Radio station in St. Johns, Michigan

- St. Johns, Michigan; United States
- Broadcast area: Lansing-East Lansing metropolitan area
- Frequency: 1580 kHz
- Branding: Joy 1580 & 100.3

Programming
- Format: Urban contemporary gospel

Ownership
- Owner: Helen Harp; (Kingdom Builders of Larlen LLC)

History
- First air date: September 23, 1959
- Former call signs: WLNZ (9/13/85); WGZS (9/2/85-9/13/85); WKLH (3/85-9/2/85); WVGO (9/83-3/85); WQTK (5/83-9/83); WKZY (11/82-5/83); WQTK (8/81-11/82); WRBJ (?-8/81); WJUD (9/59-?)
- Call sign meaning: "St. Johns"

Technical information
- Licensing authority: FCC
- Facility ID: 74002
- Class: D
- Power: 1,000 watts (Daytime); 3 watts (Nighttime)
- Transmitter coordinates: 42°58′14″N 84°32′59″W
- Translator: 100.3 W262BD (Dimondale)

Links
- Public license information: Public file; LMS
- Webcast: Listen Live
- Website: joy1580.com

WWSJ ("Joy 1580 & 100.3") is an AM radio station broadcasting from St. Johns, Michigan on 1580 kHz, featuring a black gospel format. The station transmits with 1,000 watts during the day using a directional antenna that sends the signal primarily to the north and south (including Lansing, Michigan). At night, it operates with a 3 watts.

In the summer of 2010, WWSJ began to simulcast on translator W262BD 100.3 FM licensed to Dimondale, Michigan, enabling it to get clearer FM coverage of the Lansing area day and night. W262BD operates with 22 watts from a transmitter in the heart of Lansing; despite being licensed to Dimondale, its primary signal contour does not actually reach Dimondale. W262BD is owned by Educational Media Foundation and had previously operated using EMF's Air 1 format; although EMF continues to own the translator, it is being programmed by the owners of WWSJ.

== History ==
=== Early history ===
The station began operation at 10 a.m. on September 23, 1959, as WJUD. The original owner was Justin F. Marzke. In the 1960s, it was purchased by Robert D. Ditmer and began operating under the new callsign of WRBJ. In 1972 Ditmer added WRBJ-FM on 92.1 MHz (now WQTX). During the time the station was owned by Robert Ditmer it was a true community station playing a variety of music along with local high school sports, news and announcements.

=== The 1980s bring changes ===
Robert Ditmer sold WRBJ-AM-FM to R. Charles McLravy in 1981. McLravy changed the call letters of WRBJ-AM-FM to WQTK-AM-FM, and implemented a country music format which was simulcast on both stations. AM 1580 changed calls again in November 1982, this time to WKZY, when the station switched to an MOR format as "Cozy 16". The format did not last long, and by May 1983, the station had reverted to the country music format, and also back to the WQTK calls. The station implemented Al Ham's Music of Your Life format in October 1983, this time adopting the call letters WVGO, which had recently been dropped by Lansing station WVIC. By the spring of 1985, the call station's call letters changed again, this time to WKLH, simulcasting the country music format of FM sister station WKLH-FM (K-92). In early 1985, McLravy moved the WKLH-FM studios to the DeWitt Shopping Center, although the AM studio and transmitter remained on Parks Road, just south of St. Johns.

McLravy sold WKLH-AM-FM, to Lansing Broadcasting Associates in July 1985, and on Labor Day 1985, the format of FM 92.1 was flipped to Album Oriented Rock. The call letters WGZS were applied for and assigned to AM 1580, in anticipation of a Christian format, but the format never materialized. Instead, WGZS became a simulcast of AOR sister station WLNZ-FM 92.1. The WGZS call letters, although assigned to the station for a short time, were never used on the air. Lansing Broadcasting Associates continued to maintain the AM studios on Parks Road, mainly because of an FCC requirement that both the AM and FM stations originate 50% of their news and public affairs programming from the St. Johns studio. Part-time employees were paid to operate the St. Johns studio and transmitter.

In 1986, Robert Ditmer repurchased the AM station, now known as WLNZ, and changed the call sign to WWSJ. The station featured country music, talk, local news and high school sports. During a portion of this time it went by News Radio 1580 and featured syndicated talkers Phil Donahue, Church Harder and Jack Ellery. By the mid-1990s, the station added time-brokered Tejano music programming to a portion of its broadcast day.

=== Into the '90s ===
In February 1995, Ditmer sold the station to Steve and Cheryl Evans of DeWitt, Michigan, who operated the station under the company name Mint City Radio. WWSJ continued with a mix of country music, community information, Tejano music (time-brokered) and talk programs from the USA Radio Network. The station dropped the country music portion of its format in favor of Oldies on Labor Day 1995, and was rebranded as AM-16 The Mint. The Evans' sold the station back to Ditmer in August 1996. Shortly thereafter, Ditmer resold the station to Larry Harp, Helen Harp, Wayne Hill and Elmira Hill, and it became Joy 1580 playing urban Christian music. The station still uses the original studios at the transmitter on Parks Road, just south of St. Johns.

Effective December 7, 2018, Helen Harp assumed full ownership of the station.

== Clinton County Radio ==
Clinton County Radio was an internet radio station serving Clinton County, Michigan from June 2004 until September 2007. The station programmed an Oldies format which was based upon the format previously programmed by WWSJ and was created by former station co-owner Steve Evans, who co-operated the station along with former WWSJ program director Dan Drolett. The mission of the station was to provide residents of Clinton County with programming and services which were no longer being offered by terrestrial radio stations. The station's URL was http://www.clintoncountyradio.net.

Clinton County Radio offered, in addition to Oldies from the 1960s and 70's, local weather, daily programs from the U.S.D.A., hourly news from the FSN Radio Network (and later the USA Radio Network), nostalgic radio programs under the title Radio's Golden Days, and a locally produced program entitled The Michigan Oldies Podcast. Through the use of digital automation, the station was able to operate with little if any overhead expense. Initially, the majority of announcing on the station was handled by Evans and Drolett, but Mark Walton and Bryan Mix-Dean were added as staff announcers in 2006. Both provided their services on a volunteer basis. Unlike its terrestrial predecessor WWSJ, Clinton County Radio was a non-profit operation.

Dan Drolett announced the sale of the internet station and its assets to Tony Clark of Rosebush, Michigan in early September 2007. The internet stream ceased operations as Clinton County Radio at midnight on September 30, 2007.
