= WQTX =

St. Johns, Michigan; United States
- Broadcast area: Lansing, Michigan
- Frequency: 92.1 MHz
- Branding: Stacks 92.1

Programming
- Format: Rhythmic AC
- Affiliations: Compass Media Networks

Ownership
- Owner: Midwest Communications; (Midwest Communications, Inc.)
- Sister stations: WJXQ, WLMI, WWDK

History
- First air date: 1972
- Former call signs: WRBJ-FM (1972–1981); WQTK-FM (1981–1983); WKLH-FM (1983–1985); WLNZ (1985–1989); WGOR-FM (1989–1991); WXMX (1991–1993); WWDX (1993–2003); WKMY (2003–2004); WTXQ (2004–2005)

Technical information
- Licensing authority: FCC
- Facility ID: 72121
- Class: A
- ERP: 4,000 watts
- HAAT: 122 meters
- Transmitter coordinates: 42°53′29″N 84°34′27″W

Links
- Public license information: Public file; LMS
- Webcast: Listen Live
- Website: stacks921.com

WQTX (92.1 FM, "Stacks 92.1") is a radio station broadcasting a rhythmic adult contemporary format to the Lansing, Michigan radio market. Licensed to St. Johns, Michigan, it first began broadcasting in 1972, and has been through a number of different calls and formats during its history.

== History ==
92.1 FM was originally WRBJ-FM, and, in a simulcast with WRBJ (1580 AM, now WWSJ), served St. Johns and Clinton County as a full-service local station. Original owner Robert Ditmer sold WRBJ-AM-FM in 1981 and changed both stations to a country simulcast as WQTK-AM-FM, the first of many identity changes over the next twenty years for the AM 1580 frequency. The calls eventually became WKLH-FM, continuing with a country format as "K-92", until Labor Day, 1985, when WKLH-FM became WLNZ, "The Lazer", with a rock format (the "lazer" part of the positioning referring to the station's being the first in the Lansing market to play music from compact discs). WLNZ changed to CHR/Top 40 first as "Z-92" and later as "The Ape" WGOR (as in "gorilla") in 1989, but found its ratings success against WVIC limited and its advertising revenue even worse. One more unsuccessful format followed - smooth jazz and new-age music as WXMX ("The Mix") from 1991 to 1993, before the station debuted what would become its most successful format yet.

In 1993, 92.1 FM became WWDX ("92-1 The Edge"), a modern rock station and the first such commercial radio station in Michigan in this format outside the Detroit area. Despite its limited signal reach, WWDX finally became a ratings success as "The Edge," due largely to the large college-student population in the area.

On September 17, 2003, at 1:50 p.m., it changed format to hot AC as WKMY "My 92.1." The death of "The Edge" left the decidedly non-commercial WDBM from Michigan State University as the only source for alternative rock music in the market, and left many of WWDX's loyal listeners very angry. The format and moniker would resurface again on its sister station, WVIC, in August 2009. Following the change to "My 92.1," the station plummeted in the ratings, with the station changing calls to WTXQ and began to simulcast a sports-talk format with WQTX (92.7 FM) as "The Ticket" at 6:00 p.m. on July 14, 2004.

On March 31, 2006, months after WJIM-FM dropped its long-running oldies format in favor of Top 40 in the fall of 2005, WTXQ changed its calls to the current WQTX (the former WQTX is now Classic Rock WLMI on 92.9 FM) and switched from sports talk to oldies, using a satellite-delivered format from Jones Radio Networks.

On September 2, 2008, WQTX added a live and local morning show, hosted by Lansing broadcast veteran Tim Barron.

On December 1, 2008, WQTX changed its format and name to "Classic Hits 92-X", with a new logo. On March 17, 2010, it was announced that the Rubber City Radio Group, based in Akron, Ohio, was planning to sell WQTX, along with sister stations WWDK (formerly WVIC), WJXQ, and WLMI (formerly WJZL), to Midwest Communications. The deal officially closed on July 1, 2010.

On December 27, 2010, sister station WLMI changed its format to classic hits. The format moved from WQTX, which began stunting toward a new format. From December 27 to January 4, it was a liner redirecting people to WLMI if they wanted to continue listening to the classic hits format. On January 5, it was a loop of the song Tomorrow from the musical Annie. On January 6, it was a loop of the song I Gotta Feeling by The Black Eyed Peas, emphasizing the lyric "That tonight's gonna be a good night." At 3:00 p.m. on January 6, WQTX debuted a 90's-leaning country format, branded as "92.1 Big Country".

On February 25, 2013, WQTX announced that they will be the new Lansing radio home of "Michigan's BIG Show starring Michael Patrick Shiels".

On January 9, 2015, it was announced that WQTX would flip back to sports talk, again branded as "92.1 The Ticket", only January 19. The first host on the newly revived "Ticket" was Jack Ebling, former afternoon host at WVFN. The station continues to air local sports play-by-play from area high schools. Shortly after the flip, the moniker suddenly changed to "The Team". This was due to WXYT-FM in Detroit owning the southern Michigan rights to the Ticket moniker (WKAD in Northern Michigan is the Ticket).

On September 4, 2018, the Lansing State Journal reported that WQTX would drop the sports format at 6 a.m. the following day and flip to a '90s/2000s hits format as "Fuel 92.1". The change came because, as Midwest Communications VP/market manager Mark Jaycox had told the newspaper, the sports format was unprofitable to run. "Michigan's Big Show" will move to WJIM in a delayed 9 a.m.-12 p.m. slot, while the afternoon "Drive with Jack Ebling and Tom Crawford" and "Spartan Beat with Rico Beard" will both remain available online.

On March 26, 2020, after stunting with a loop of "The Song That Never Ends" for two days, WQTX flipped to rhythmic adult contemporary as Stacks 92.1 (alluding to the smokestacks of the Eckert Power Plant on Lansing's skyline).
