= WKHM =

WKHM can refer to:

- WKHM (AM), a radio station (970 AM) licensed to Jackson, Michigan, United States
- WKHM-FM, a radio station (105.3 FM) licensed to Brooklyn, Michigan, United States
