= WJXQ =

Radio station in Charlotte, Michigan

- Charlotte, Michigan; United States
- Broadcast area: Lansing metropolitan area
- Frequency: 106.1 MHz
- Branding: Q106

Programming
- Format: Active Rock
- Affiliations: United Stations Radio Networks; Westwood One

Ownership
- Owner: Midwest Communications
- Sister stations: WLMI, WQTX, WWDK

History
- First air date: 1964 (as WKHM-FM); 1976 (as WJOX-FM)
- Former call signs: WKDM-FM (1964–1976); WJOX-FM (1976-3/13/81)
- Call sign meaning: Jackson

Technical information
- Licensing authority: FCC
- Facility ID: 55656
- Class: B
- ERP: 49,000 watts
- HAAT: 151.3 meters (496 ft)
- Transmitter coordinates: 42°23′31″N 84°37′22″W

Links
- Public license information: Public file; LMS
- Webcast: Listen Live
- Website: q106fm.com

WJXQ (106.1 FM, "Q106") is a commercial radio station licensed to Charlotte, Michigan, and serving the Lansing radio market. WJXQ is owned by Midwest Communications and airs an active rock radio format. Studios and offices are located on Cedar St. in Holt. The transmitter is on Prime Road in Springport.

The station begins each weekday with The Bob & Tom Show, syndicated from Indianapolis. Local DJs are heard the rest of each weekday. Weekends feature The House of Hair with Dee Snider, Racing Rocks with Riki Rachtman and Hard Drive with Lou Brutus

== History ==
=== WKHM-FM ===
In 1964, the station first signed on as WKHM-FM, originally licensed to Jackson. It was the sister station to WKHM (970 AM), owned by the Jackson Broadcasting & TV Corporation.

It originally simulcasted WKHM's full service middle of the road music format, along with news coverage from the Mutual Broadcasting System. (Other than call letters, WJXQ is not related to the current WKHM-FM licensed to Brooklyn, Michigan, known as "K105.3.")

=== Stereo Rock/WJOX ===
The simulcast ended in 1976, when 106.1 FM changed its call sign to WJOX, and switched to TM Programming's automated "Stereo Rock" Top 40 format. The station's morning show, hosted by local talent Jerry Barnhart, was live, but the rest of the dayparts were full automation, complete with pre-recorded song backsells from TM's John Borders, a voice heard on many Stereo Rock stations across the country at the time. The station's moniker was "Rock 106 WJOX." WJOX only broadcast at an effective radiated power of 20,000 watts from a 180-foot tower, so its signal was limited, mainly serving the Jackson area.

The TM format was maintained until 1981, when the station moved its tower and transmitter from Jackson to a location four miles east-north-east of the town of Springport, in the northwestern part of Jackson County and increased power to 50,000 watts in preparation to begin serving the larger Lansing market with a brand new format. (WJXQ can be heard as far away as Angola, Indiana, Alma, Michigan, as far west as Kentwood on the outskirts of Grand Rapids and as far east as Novi in the western suburbs of Detroit.)

=== Q106 debuts ===
On March 11, 1981, the call letters were switched to WJXQ. The station's power had more than doubled from a new tower site, giving it a strong signal into Lansing. Gone was the automated TM Stereo Rock format, and it was replaced by a Rock 40 format with high energy live air talent under the new moniker Q106. WJXQ's very first song was "Rock and Roll Never Forgets" from Bob Seger & The Silver Bullet Band.

The original Q106 "QJs" consisted of Patricia "Patty" Cheeks & Jimmy "Jim" Ryan for mornings, Roger "Big Rog" Sinclair for middays, Jim Ryan in afternoon drive, Terrence "Terry Hester" Hesters in evenings, Michael "Mike" Vaughn in nights, Donald "Don" Poole in overnights, and Jackson "Jack" Daniels for weekends.

Within three months, WJXQ claimed the #1 spot 12+ in the Lansing Arbitron ratings from relative obscurity. WILS-FM was hit hard and changed to an AC format in April 1984.

Other Q106 talent included Brian "Maloney" Montgomery, David "Dave" Mennard, with Craig Bordeaux, and Peter "Pete" Bucalo.

=== The 1980s/1990s - WJXQ vs. WVIC ===
The new Q106 would soon face tough competition from another Top 40 station, WVIC, consulted by E. Alvin Davis. The two stations engaged in a Top 40/CHR radio war in the early and mid 1980s, from which WVIC would eventually emerge as the ratings leader. In the fall of 1985, Q106 dropped their rock 40 approach for a more pop-oriented top 40 direction, playing artists such as Madonna and Michael Jackson, trying to take on WVIC directly. But the effort ultimately failed, and within two years, WJXQ was gearing back towards a rock 40 format, this time concentrating on an AOR basis. It was that here the station found its very own niche and Q106's ratings began to rebound.

By the early 1990s, Q106 had solid ratings helped in part by the success of the Debbie Hart and Timmy Barron morning show, which had developed a steady following. Then, in January 1997, when Debbie and Timmy left the station for WVIC (which, by then, was airing an active rock format as Buzz 95), they were replaced by the syndicated Bob and Tom Show from Indianapolis' WFBQ, which remains popular on the station to this day.

WJXQ briefly changed its moniker to The All Brand Spanking New Q106 in the fall of 1997. This was accompanied by a format modification toward alternative rock. The moniker returned to the legendary Q106 within six months, although the format modifications remained in place. In 2000, WJXQ was acquired by the Rubber City Radio Group based in Akron, Ohio.

On March 17, 2010, it was announced that the Rubber City Radio Group was planning to sell WJXQ, along with sister stations WWDK, WQTX, and WLMI to Midwest Communications. The deal officially closed on July 1, 2010. Midwest Communications later shifted WJXQ's city of license from Jackson to Charlotte, although the location of the transmitter and studios remained the same.
