= KFLX =

- Chino Valley, Arizona; United States
- Broadcast area: Prescott, Arizona
- Frequency: 92.5 MHz
- Branding: Rewind 92.5 & 104.1

Programming
- Format: 80's hits
- Affiliations: Compass Media Networks

Ownership
- Owner: Stone Canyon Media Group; (Stone Canyon of Flagstaff, LLC)
- Sister stations: KBTK, KSED, KWMX

History
- First air date: 1989 (at 105.1); July 2010 (at 92.5)
- Former call signs: KBTK (2010)
- Former frequencies: 105.1 MHz (1989–2010)

Technical information
- Licensing authority: FCC
- Facility ID: 171022
- Class: A
- ERP: 1,500 watts
- HAAT: 174 meters (571 ft)
- Transmitter coordinates: 34°42′53.00″N 112°31′33.00″W
- Translator: 104.1 K281BE (Flagstaff)

Links
- Public license information: Public file; LMS
- Webcast: Listen live
- Website: rewindmymusic.com

KFLX (92.5 FM) is a radio station broadcasting an 80's hits format. Licensed to Chino Valley, Arizona, United States, it serves the Prescott area. The station is currently owned by Stone Canyon Media Group.

== History ==
KFLX started as a construction permit granted to Ted Tucker and his Desert West Air Ranchers Corporation for a new station on 105.1 kHz in Winslow with the call letters KTDX. Tucker was able to shoehorn KTDX into the more populous Flagstaff market (city of license: Kachina Village) and changed the call letters to KFLX. The construction permit changed hands to D.B. Broadcasting in 1994, then to Red Rock Communications a year later. Red Rock signed the station on with an adult album alternative format named "The Eagle". Toward the end of the 1990s and early 2000s, KFLX morphed into an adult alternative/modern AC hybrid similar to that of Phoenix's KZON.

Red Rock continued to own the station until it and sisters KWMX-FM and KSED-FM were sold in 2007, to Grenax Broadcasting II, LLC who also owned WCFX in Mount Pleasant, MI. Grenax completely transformed the station into a pure hot AC station as "105.1 The Canyon".

In January 2009, 105.1 The Canyon, along with sister stations 96.7 The WOLF and 107.5 KOLT Country, moved into state of the art studios on 4th Street in Flagstaff.

In July 2010, KFLX moved to 92.5 FM licensed to Chino Valley, AZ. Sister station KBTK took the 105.1 frequency licensed to Kachina Village as 105.1 The Big Talker.

In January 2012, 92.5/104.1 began promoting that they were "pressing the big red button on the 20th" and to tune in at 9:25 am that morning to find out what the stations were up to (along with that, several songs in that span were played in reverse). On that day at that time, KFLX began stunting with sound clips of songs, commercials, and television shows from the 1980s, and introduced an 80's hits format on the stations, branded as "Rewind 92.5 & 104.1". The last 2 songs on "The Canyon" were It's The End Of The World As We Know It (And I Feel Fine) by R.E.M, and the first 90 seconds of A Change Would Do You Good by Sheryl Crow. The first 2 songs on "Rewind" were The Go-Go's We Got The Beat and Michael Jackson's Billie Jean.

On September 24, 2018, Grenax Broadcasting II, LLC, announced the sale of KFLX and sister stations KBTK, KSED and KWMX to Stone Canyon Media Group. the purchase was completed in December.
