= WJIM =

WJIM can refer to:

- WJIM (AM), a radio station (1240 AM) licensed to Lansing, Michigan, United States
- WJIM-FM, a radio station (97.5 FM) licensed to Lansing, Michigan, United States
