= KBTK =

Radio station in Arizona, US

- Kachina Village, Arizona; United States
- Broadcast area: Flagstaff, Arizona
- Frequency: 97.1 MHz
- Branding: 97.1 The Big Talker

Programming
- Format: Conservative talk
- Affiliations: Fox News Radio; Premiere Networks; Westwood One

Ownership
- Owner: Stone Canyon Media Group; (Stone Canyon of Flagstaff, LLC)
- Sister stations: KSED, KFLX, KWMX

History
- First air date: 1989 (as KFLX at 105.1)
- Former call signs: KFLX (1989–2010)
- Former frequencies: 105.1 MHz (1989–2016)
- Call sign meaning: 'Big TalKer (station branding)

Technical information
- Licensing authority: FCC
- Facility ID: 14938
- Class: C2
- ERP: 5,000 watts
- HAAT: 444 meters (1,457 ft)
- Transmitter coordinates: 34°58′6″N 111°30′29″W
- Translator: 107.9 K300DZ (Prescott)

Links
- Public license information: Public file; LMS
- Webcast: Listen Live
- Website: bigtalkerradio.com

KBTK (97.1 FM, "97.1 The Big Talker") is a radio station licensed to Kachina Village, Arizona. Owned by Stone Canyon Media Group, it broadcasts a conservative talk format serving Flagstaff, Arizona.

== History ==
KBTK signed on as KFLX which started as a construction permit granted to Ted Tucker and his Desert West Air Ranchers Corporation for a new station on 105.1 kHz in Winslow with the call letters KTDX. Tucker was able to shoehorn KTDX into the more populous Flagstaff market (city of license: Kachina Village) and changed the call letters to KFLX. The construction permit changed hands to D.B. Broadcasting in 1994, then to Red Rock Communications a year later. Red Rock signed the station on with an Adult album alternative format named "The Eagle". Toward the end of the 1990s and early 2000s, KFLX morphed into an adult alternative/Modern AC hybrid similar to that of Phoenix's KZON.

Red Rock continued to own the station until it and sisters KWMX-FM and KSED-FM were sold in 2007 to Grenax Broadcasting II, LLC who also owned WCFX in Mount Pleasant, MI. Grenax completely transformed the station into a pure Hot AC station as "105.1 The Canyon".

The station known as 105.1 The Canyon became Hot Adult Contemporary. In July 2010, KFLX flipped to talk radio as 97.1 The Big Talker, primarily featuring conservative personalities such as Glenn Beck, Rush Limbaugh, Sean Hannity. The Mitch and Joe Show also debuted when the station changed formats, which features local broadcast veterans Joe Harting and Mitch Strohman. Jason Lewis, Phil Hendrie and America's Morning News were also part of the original weekday line up. Since its launch, a few changes in the weekday line up have occurred. Mark Levin replaced Jason Lewis, and Roy Masters replaced Phil Hendrie. In August 2013, Mitch Strohman announced he was leaving the Mitch and Joe Show to put more emphasis on his job as 'The Voice of the Lumberjacks' calling sports for Northern Arizona University's athletics program. The Joe Harting Show began following Strohman's departure, with Harting hosting the local talk program solo, Harting left KBTK in 2015 to focus on his full-time job at NAU.

On October 19, 2016, KBTK moved from 105.1 to 97.1, due to conflicts with KHOV/Wickensburg after its move to the frequency.

On September 24, 2018, Grenax Broadcasting II, LLC announced the sale of KBTK and its sister stations to Stone Canyon Media Group; the purchase was completed in December.
