= WCFX =

Coordinates: 43.745°N 84.803°W

- Clare, Michigan; United States
- Broadcast area: Mount Pleasant, Michigan Clare, Michigan
- Frequency: 95.3 MHz
- Branding: 95.3 CFX

Programming
- Format: Top 40 (CHR)

Ownership
- Owner: Black Diamond Broadcasting

History
- First air date: June 28, 1967 (as WCRM-FM)
- Former call signs: WRNN-FM (6/11/79-11/15/80); WCRM-FM (6/28/67-6/11/79)
- Call sign meaning: We are Clare's FoXy 95 FM! (former branding)

Technical information
- Licensing authority: FCC
- Facility ID: 39546
- Class: A
- ERP: 6,000 watts
- HAAT: 100 meters

Links
- Public license information: Public file; LMS
- Webcast: Listen Live
- Website: wcfx.com

WCFX is an FM radio station broadcasting at 6,000 watts in Clare, Michigan. The station primarily serves Mt. Pleasant, Michigan, the home of Central Michigan University, with a Top 40 (CHR) format as "Today's Hits, 95-3 CFX." The station has operated with its current calls and format since 1980.

What is now WCFX was originally WCRM-FM, co-owned with the now-defunct WCRM/990 (the calls stood for Crossroads of Michigan, referring to the station's being located near the geographic center of the state). It became WRNN-FM on June 6, 1979. Later that year, both AM 990 and 95.3 FM went off the air. In 1980 the silent 95.3 FM was purchased by legendary Detroit broadcaster Paul Christy and returned to the air with Top 40 programming in November of that year as WCFX, originally known as "Foxy 95."

Christy obtained the call letter of the station he had previously consulted in Detroit, WABX (now WYCD), and parked the WABX calls on the former WCRM AM 990. During the AM station's hours of operation, it was simulcast with WCFX, and the stations were identified as "WCFX-FM and WABX-AM". WABX ceased operation in 1988, and its license and frequency allocation were forfeited to the FCC.

In August 2003, Grenax Broadcasting purchased the property for $2.875 million. Previous to that, the station had been owned by Jackson Radio Works, owners of WKHM (AM), WKHM-FM, and WIBM radio in Jackson, Michigan.

WCFX FM's signal reaches a significant portion of central Michigan. Its coverage area includes the area's of Clare, Mount Pleasant, Alma, Midland, Harrison, Coleman, Gladwin and Beaverton, with a listenable signal west to Big Rapids. Playing a mix of today's Top 40, CHR, and Hot Adult Contemporary.

== Programming ==
The Breakfast Flakes 6am-10am Monday-fri)

CFX Saturday Night Party Playlist Saturday 7pm-Midnight

Rick Dee's Weekly Top 40 Sunday 10am-2pm.
