= Delhi Charter Township, Michigan =

Delhi Township, Michigan
- Charter township
- Delhi Charter Township
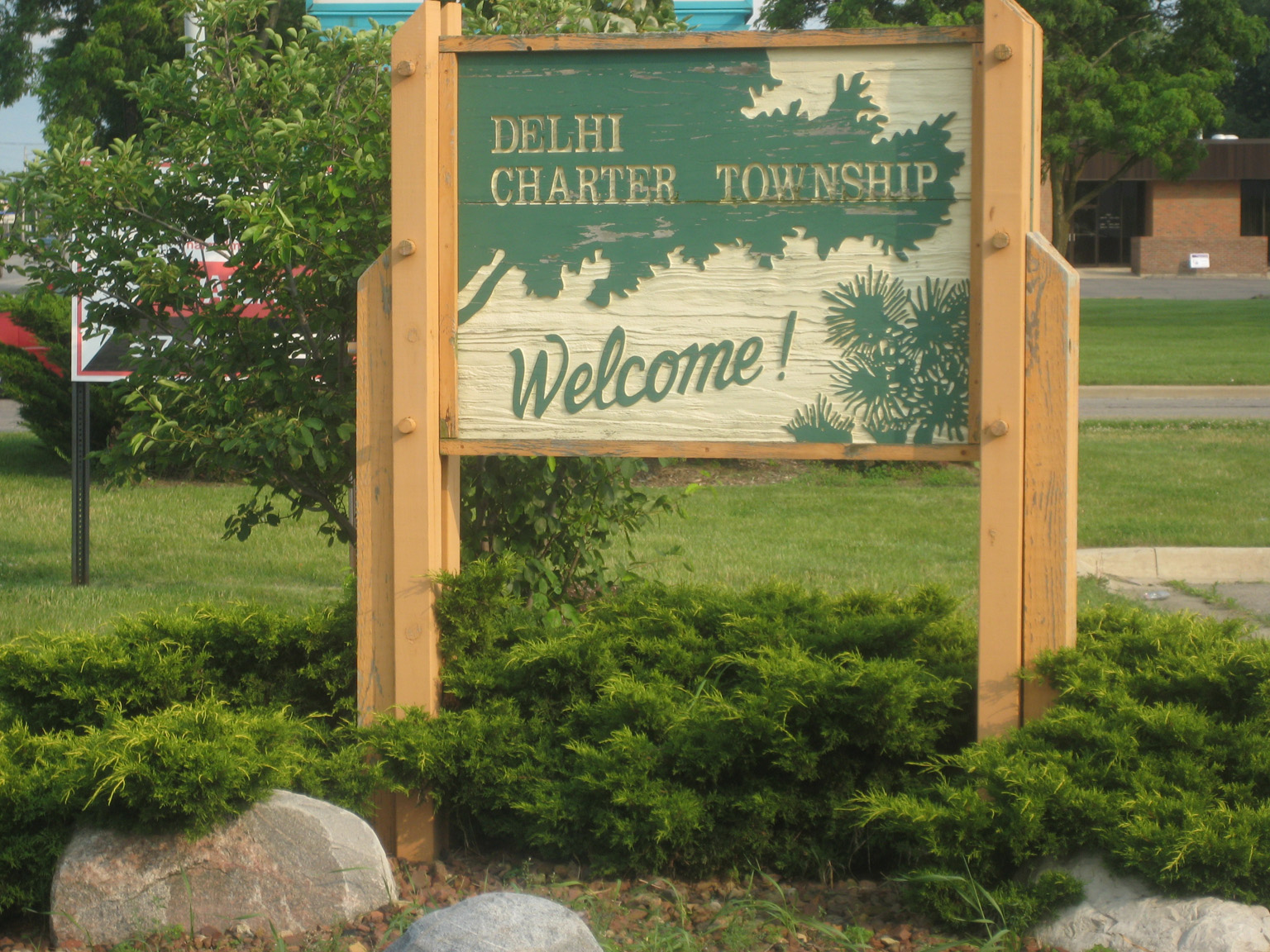
- Delhi Charter Township sign along Cedar Street

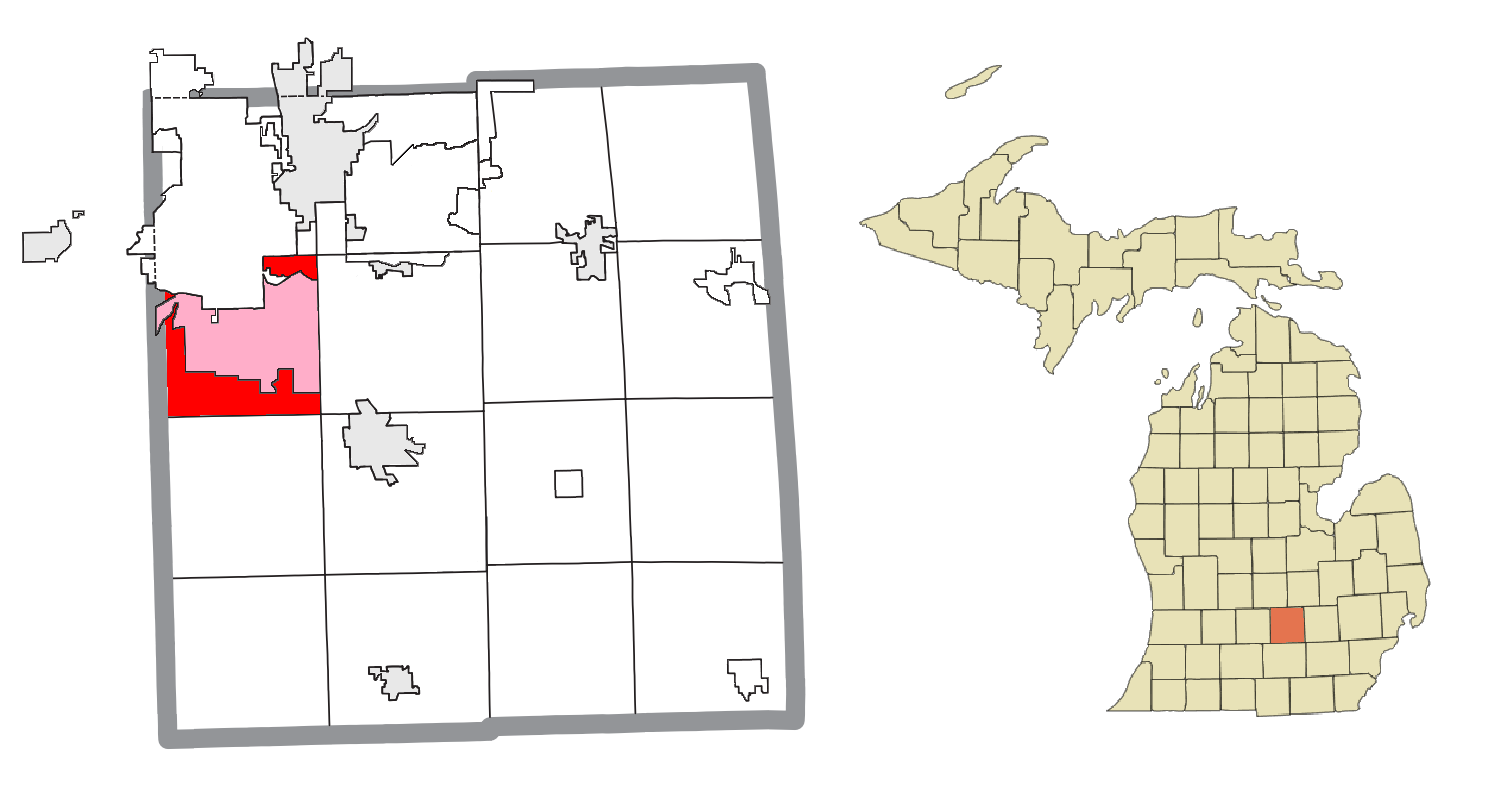
- Location within Ingham County (red) and the administered CDP of Holt (pink)

- Location within the state of Michigan Location within the United States
- Coordinates: 42°37′59″N 84°32′17″W
- Country: United States
- State: Michigan
- County: Ingham
- Settled: 1837
- Organized: 1842

Government
  - Supervisor: John Hayhoe
  - Clerk: Evan Hope

Area
  - Total: 29.03 sq mi (75.19 km^{2})
  - Land: 28.61 sq mi (74.10 km^{2})
  - Water: 0.42 sq mi (1.09 km^{2})
- Elevation: 892 ft (272 m)

Population (2020)
  - Total: 27,710
  - Density: 67,020/sq mi (25,877/km^{2})
- Time zone: UTC-5 (EST)
  - Summer (DST): UTC-4 (EDT)
- ZIP code(s): 48842 (Holt); 48911 (Lansing)
- Area code: 517
- FIPS code: 26-21420
- GNIS feature ID: 1626174
- Website: Official website

Delhi Charter Township (/ˈdɛlhaɪ/ DEL-hy) is a charter township of Ingham County in the U.S. state of Michigan. The population was 27,710 at the 2020 census, an increase from 25,877 in 2010 census.

Delhi Township is located directly south of the city of Lansing and is the fifth-largest municipality in Lansing–East Lansing metropolitan area.

== Communities ==
- Holt is an unincorporated community in the township that is also a census-designated place for statistical purposes. Holt is just south of Interstate 96 and is about 6 miles northwest of Mason. Most of the population of Delhi lives in Holt.
- The city of Lansing is adjacent to the north and has incorporated land that was formerly within the township. Much of the township is considered to be part of the Greater Lansing urban area.
- The city of Mason is nearby to the southeast and the village of Dimondale is to the west.

== Geography ==
According to the United States Census Bureau, the township has a total area of 29.03 square miles (75.19 km^{2}), of which 28.61 square miles (74.10 km^{2}) is land and 0.42 square miles (1.09 km^{2}) (1.45%) is water.

The Grand River flows through the southwestern part of the township, and Sycamore Creek flows through its northeastern part.

== History ==
The first permanent settlers in Delhi Township, John Norris and Fred Luther, arrived in 1837. In 1850, 402 settlers resided in the township. By 1857 Delhi Center (now Holt) had a post office, hotel, tavern, and several other businesses.

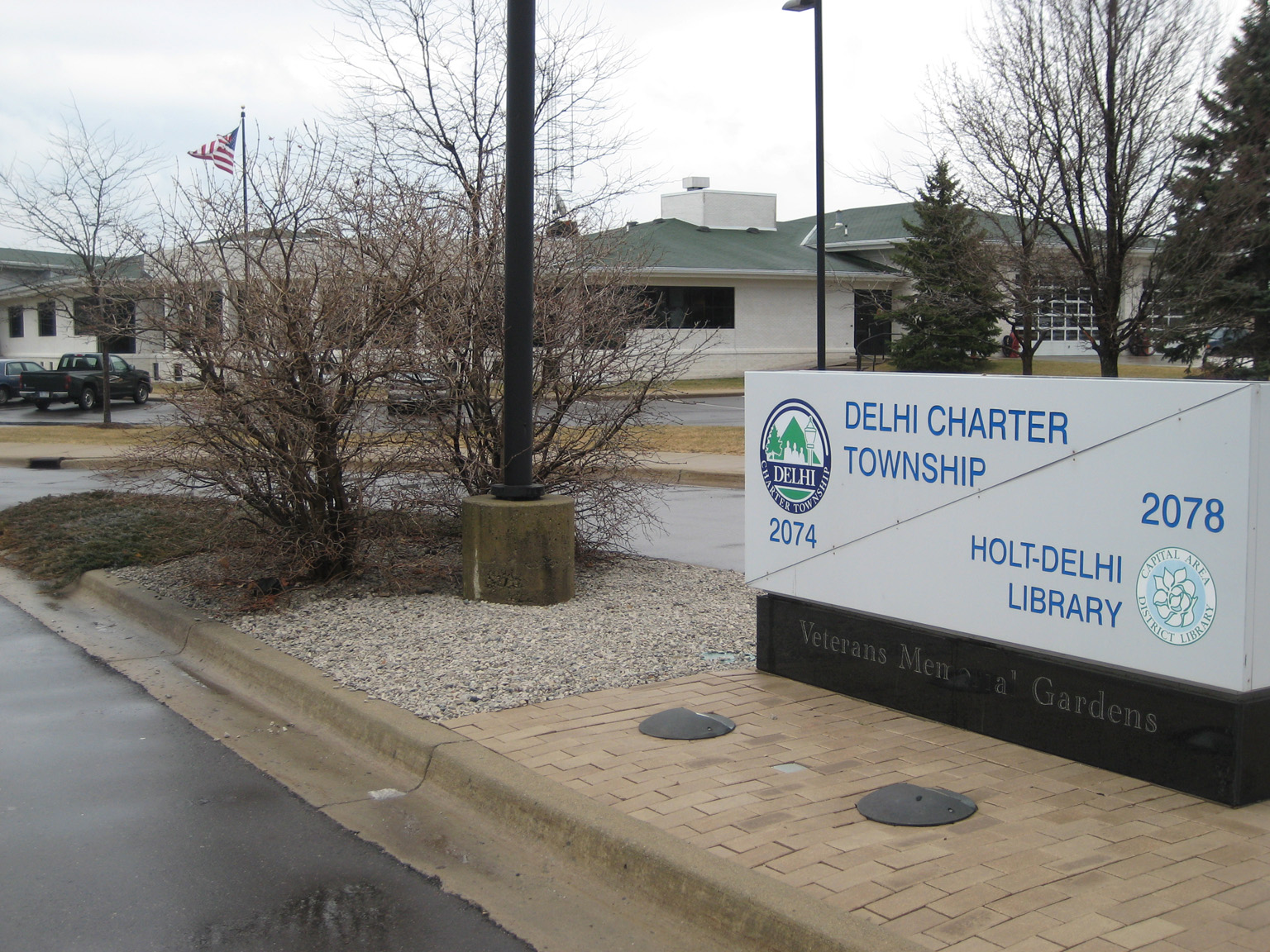
Delhi Township administrative offices and Holt-Delhi Library

== Demographics ==
Historical population
Census	Pop.	Note	%±
1960	16,590		—
1970	13,795		−16.8%
1980	17,144		24.3%
1990	19,190		11.9%
2000	22,569		17.6%
2010	25,877		14.7%
2020	27,710		7.1%
2021 (est.)	27,770		0.2%
U.S. Decennial Census

=== 2000 census ===
As of the census of 2000, there were 22,569 people, 8,563 households, and 6,268 families residing in the township. The population density was 783.2 inhabitants per square mile (302.4/km^{2}). There were 8,988 housing units at an average density of 311.9 per square mile (120.4/km^{2}). The racial makeup of the township was 92.95% White, 2.36% African American, 0.49% Native American, 1.15% Asian, 0.04% Pacific Islander, 0.94% from other races, and 2.06% from two or more races. Hispanic or Latino of any race were 3.56% of the population.

There were 8,563 households, out of which 40.0% had children under the age of 18 living with them, 57.4% were married couples living together, 11.9% had a female householder with no husband present, and 26.8% were non-families. 22.2% of all households were made up of individuals, and 7.6% had someone living alone who was 65 years of age or older. The average household size was 2.61 and the average family size was 3.06. In the township, the population was spread out, with 28.9% under the age of 18, 7.1% from 18 to 24, 30.7% from 25 to 44, 23.7% from 45 to 64, and 9.6% who were 65 years of age or older. The median age was 36 years. For every 100 females, there were 91.5 males. For every 100 females age 18 and over, there were 87.5 males.

The median income for a household in the township was $50,922, and the median income for a family was $61,837. Males had a median income of $45,774 versus $31,192 for females. The per capita income for the township was $23,485. About 3.2% of families and 5.2% of the population were below the poverty line, including 5.8% of those under age 18 and 5.9% of those age 65 or over.

== Education ==
Most of the township is in Holt Public Schools. Some parts are in Mason Public Schools and Eaton Rapids Public Schools.

Parts of Michigan State University extend into this township. The Horticulture Teaching and Research Center is in the township.
