= WITL-FM =

Country music radio station in Lansing, Michigan

Lansing, Michigan; United States
- Broadcast area: Lansing–East Lansing metropolitan area
- Frequency: 100.7 MHz (HD Radio)
- Branding: 100.7 WITL

Programming
- Format: Country
- Subchannels: HD2: WONU simulcast HD3: Air1
- Affiliations: Compass Media Networks; Westwood One

Ownership
- Owner: Townsquare Media; (Townsquare License, LLC)
- Sister stations: WFMK, WJIM, WJIM-FM, WMMQ, WVFN

History
- First air date: June 26, 1961
- Former call signs: WMRT (1961–1964); WYFE (1964–1966)
- Call sign meaning: Whittle

Technical information
- Licensing authority: FCC
- Facility ID: 46706
- Class: B
- ERP: 26,500 watts
- HAAT: 196 meters (643 ft)
- Transmitter coordinates: 42°40′33″N 84°30′0″W
- Translators: HD2: 95.3 W237BY (Mason); HD3: 95.9 W240CG (Webberville)

Links
- Public license information: Public file; LMS
- Webcast: Listen Live
- Website: witl.com

WITL-FM (100.7 FM) is a radio station broadcasting a country music format. Licensed to Lansing, Michigan, and serving Ingham, Eaton and Clinton Counties in Michigan.

The Transmitter is located off Pine tree road in Lansing, near the interchange of I-96 and US-127.

It first began broadcasting on June 26, 1961 alongside daytime only station WMRT (AM). The stations were purchased by Mid-West Family Broadcasting for $187,000 in 1964 and took the WITL and WITL-FM call sign in 1966, and adopted a full-time country music format in 1967. Originally, WITL-FM was simulcast with (now defunct) WITL (AM) at 1010 kHz. The AM station went silent in 1997. It is currently owned and operated by Townsquare Media. Notable station alumni include author and former ABC News correspondent Tim O'Brien and progressive talk show host Thom Hartmann.

On August 30, 2013, a deal was announced in which Townsquare would acquire 53 Cumulus Media stations, including WITL-FM, for $238 million. The deal was part of Cumulus' acquisition of Dial Global; Townsquare and Dial Global were both controlled by Oaktree Capital Management. The transaction was consummated effective November 14, 2013.

After moving to new studios and offices shared with co-owned stations, the original 'white house' studios and offices were torn down in 2017.

WITL-FM is licensed for HD Radio operations. Its HD2 feed features the Olivet Nazarene University-owned "Shine.FM" Contemporary Christian music format originating at WONU in Kankakee, Illinois with local imaging, feeding ONU-owned analog translator W237BY 95.3 FM licensed to Mason with transmitter in downtown Lansing. Its HD3 signal airs Christian music from Air1.
