= WMMQ =

Radio station in East Lansing, Michigan

East Lansing, Michigan; United States
- Broadcast area: Lansing, Michigan
- Frequency: 94.9 MHz
- Branding: Classic Rock 94.9

Programming
- Format: Classic rock
- Affiliations: Compass Media Networks; Westwood One

Ownership
- Owner: Townsquare Media; (Townsquare License, LLC)
- Sister stations: WFMK, WITL-FM, WJIM, WJIM-FM, WVFN

History
- First air date: 1963 (as WCER)
- Former call signs: WVIC-FM (9/11/83-6/1/97); WVIC (6/8/83-9/11/83); WVIC-FM (5/6/81-6/8/83); WVIC (1963-5/6/81)

Technical information
- Facility ID: 24641
- Class: B
- ERP: 50,000 watts
- HAAT: 150 meters
- Transmitter coordinates: 42°38′45″N 84°33′38″W

Links
- Webcast: Listen Live
- Website: wmmq.com

WMMQ (94.9 FM) is an American classic rock radio station licensed to East Lansing, Michigan. The station is owned by Townsquare Media.

== History ==
What is now the current incarnation of WMMQ began broadcasting in 1963 as WVIC-FM, the sister station to WVIC (730 AM, now sports formatted WVFN). The station aired an MOR format. In the early 1970s, WVIC switched to Top 40 and "owned" the college crowd, and became one of the top-rated stations in Lansing. The manager and part owner was Bob Sherman, who also did sports. Morning man and music director Bruce Buchanan (Charlie Tuna on air), who was fired for leaving a radio station softball team game at 11 p.m. to get some sleep for the following morning's show, went on to debut WHNN in Bay City in August 1973. Buchanan later became ops manager of KVIL Dallas. Another alumnus was Kevin McCarthy, who went to Dallas and was inducted into the Texas Hall of Fame. WVIC dropped out of the simulcast and became sports-talk WVFN in June 1992.

WVIC-FM's period as Lansing's top Top 40/CHR station came to an end on March 1, 1995, when the station became "Wild Country 94-9 The Cat" in an attempt to take on longtime country music station and market leader WITL-FM. "The Cat" lasted only a few months before the station was acquired by the owners of WITL-FM. Under new ownership by Liggett Communications, WVIC-FM decided to take on longtime album rocker WJXQ with an active rock format as "Buzz 95." The WJXQ morning show team of Tim Barron and Deb Hart moved to 94.9 FM in 1996, and the station adjusted its format to a more mainstream rock approach.

On June 1, 1997, WVIC (94.9 FM) and WMMQ (92.7 FM) switched programming and call signs (though the new WVIC did not continue to air the mainstream rock format from 94.9; instead, it would go dark). WMMQ's Classic rock format moved to the higher-powered signal at 94.9 after being sold to movie theater chain owner Robert Goodrich of Grand Rapids (who developed and owned WVIC originally).

The former morning show on WMMQ consisted of Rich Michaels, formerly of sister station WJIM-FM (arriving to that station after its format change from Oldies to CHR on September 15, 2005). Joining Michaels is Deb Hart. Ironically, Rich Michaels was also the morning show host on 94.9 during the heyday of the original WVIC in the 1980s and early 1990s. Michaels was suspended from on-air activities on Wednesday, August 14, 2008, for on-air comments about a building project in Lansing. In 2010, Rich Michaels was let go.

=== Other call sign and frequency uses ===
The original 92.7 Charlotte-based WMMQ signal (now WLMI) moved to 92.9 in late October 2006 and is now licensed to the community of Grand Ledge. WLMI is owned by Midwest Communications. The legendary WVIC call sign remained in the hands of Midwest and was used for a time on what is now WQTX and WWDK.

== Today ==
=== Programming ===
A long-standing fixture on WMMQ, dating back to its earliest days in 1985 on 92.7, is the "All-Request Saturday Night". The show's origins are traced back to then AOR formatted 101 WILS-FM. It was hosted for 25+ years by Larry "Allen" Estlack until his death in December 2013. Estlack, who went by Larry "Allen" on the air, was the engineer for WILS and later WMMQ. The show, now hosted by Wally Londo, runs from 7:00 pm to midnight and usually has a featured artist or theme each week, and consists of a playlist entirely supplied by listener phone and e-mail requests.

WMMQ continues to be consistently rated in Lansing's top 10 – and was ranked in the top three in local adult 25–54 market ratings in the fall of 2006.

WMMQ currently streams its programming 24/7 using the Windows Media format through a link on its website listed below.

=== Ownership ===
In 2000, Liggett Communications sold WMMQ, WVFN, WITL, WJIM-FM, WJIM, and WFMK to Citadel Broadcasting.

Citadel was acquired by Cumulus Media Cumulus Media in 2011.

On August 30, 2013, a deal was announced in which Townsquare Media would acquire 53 Cumulus Media stations, including WMMQ, for $238 million. The deal is part of Cumulus' acquisition of Dial Global; Townsquare and Dial Global are both controlled by Oaktree Capital Management. The sale to Townsquare was completed on November 14, 2013.

=== Technical ===
WMMQ broadcasts with an Effective Radiated Power of 50,000 watts from a site near Holt, Michigan in Ingham County. The transmitter site is located off of Gunn Road and is shared by WMMQ and WVFN. This was the original transmitter site utilized when both stations operated under the WVIC call sign. The WVIC studio was located on Mount Hope Road between Aurelius and Harrison Roads.

Three short towers are aligned on the site which are used for the daytime directional antenna pattern of 730 AM WVFN. In the center of the array is a 500-foot tower used for 94.9 FM. This tower also doubles as WVFN's omni-directional nighttime array.
