= K105 =

K105 or K-105 may refer to:

- K-105 (Kansas highway), a state highway in Kansas
- HMS Loosestrife, a former UK Royal Navy ship

== See also ==
- WKHM-FM, a radio station
