= WFMK =

Adult contemporary radio station in Lansing, Michigan

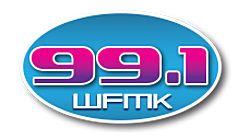
- East Lansing, Michigan; United States
- Broadcast area: Lansing-East Lansing metropolitan area
- Frequency: 99.1 MHz (HD Radio)
- Branding: 99.1 WFMK

Programming
- Format: Adult contemporary
- Affiliations: Compass Media Networks; Westwood One

Ownership
- Owner: Townsquare Media; (Townsquare License, LLC)
- Sister stations: WITL-FM, WJIM, WJIM-FM, WMMQ, WVFN

History
- First air date: July 16, 1959; 66 years ago (as WSWM)
- Former call signs: WSWM (1959–1971)

Technical information
- Licensing authority: FCC
- Facility ID: 37460
- Class: B
- ERP: 28,000 watts
- HAAT: 183 meters (600 ft)
- Transmitter coordinates: 42°40′33″N 84°30′0″W

Links
- Public license information: Public file; LMS
- Webcast: Listen Live
- Website: 99wfmk.com

WFMK (99.1 FM) is an adult contemporary radio station licensed to East Lansing, Michigan and serving the Lansing radio market. The station is owned by Townsquare Media and broadcasts in HD radio. WFMK is one of the oldest adult contemporary stations, as it has been carrying the format for almost 5 decades. The station also switches to an all-Christmas music format, temporarily replacing its AC format from mid-November through December.

The Studios are on Pine Tree Road and its transmitter is near downtown Lansing. WFMK operates with an ERP of 28,000 watts, making it a class B radio station.

== History ==
WSWM was founded in 1959 by John P. McGoff who sold the station to Robert G. Liggett Jr. owner of Liggett Communications in 1971. Liggett changed the station's call sign to WFMK, and initially programmed a mix of Adult Contemporary music as "Stereo Island, WFMK 99" during the day (using the Stereo Island approach pioneered at WKNR-FM in Detroit), and Album Oriented Rock overnight. The AOR portion of the format was dropped in the mid-1970s, and the Adult Contemporary format expanded to 24 hours a day, under the moniker Easy Rockin' FM 99.

Over the years WFMK's adult contemporary format has evolved to the point that the station's current slogan is "A Variety From the '80s to Now." WFMK has long been one of the most popular and most highly rated stations in the Lansing area.

When WHZZ in Lansing, Michigan abruptly changed format from Contemporary Hit Radio to Adult Hits in 2005, WFMK, along with WQHH and WJXQ temporarily took advantage of the format switch, touting the many CHR artists on the station until WFMK's sister station, WJIM-FM changed format from oldies to CHR a few days later.

On August 30, 2013, a deal was announced in which Townsquare Media would acquire 53 Cumulus Media stations, including WFMK, for $238 million. The deal is part of Cumulus' acquisition of Dial Global; Townsquare and Dial Global are both controlled by Oaktree Capital Management. The sale to Townsquare was completed on November 14, 2013 and WFMK came under the Townsquare ownership.

== Christmas Music ==
WFMK Christmas Logo

Each year, WFMK switches to all Christmas music for the holiday season. The tradition began in 2010 when the station flipped to the format 24/7 for the first time. The Christmas Music usually begins the week before Thanksgiving and continues through Christmas Day. This Christmas format competes with WXLA, which also goes all-Christmas for the season.

== Jingle ==
WFMK has had its jingle melody changed over the years. During the mid and late 1980s, WFMK's jingles were by JAM Creative Productions and used the WENS melody. In the 1990s, WFMK's jingles, by TM Century, also used the WENS melody, which also was the call sign melody for WMXV. WFMK's jingle melody was changed again when the station began using the "Cuddle" jingle package from Thompson Creative; this package remained for seven years. The most recent jingle melody change came in 2007 when WFMK began using Reelworld's 2007 WLIT jingle package; WFMK has stayed with Reelworld and the WLIT melody ever since. Their current jingle package to this day is Reelworld One AC and the KVIL package, both using the same WLIT melody.
