= ESPN Radio 1450 =

ESPN Radio 1450 may refer to:

- WLEJ (AM) serving the State College, Pennsylvania, market
- WIBM serving the Jackson, Michigan, market
