= The Listening Ear =

Coordinates: 42.7333°N 84.5161°W

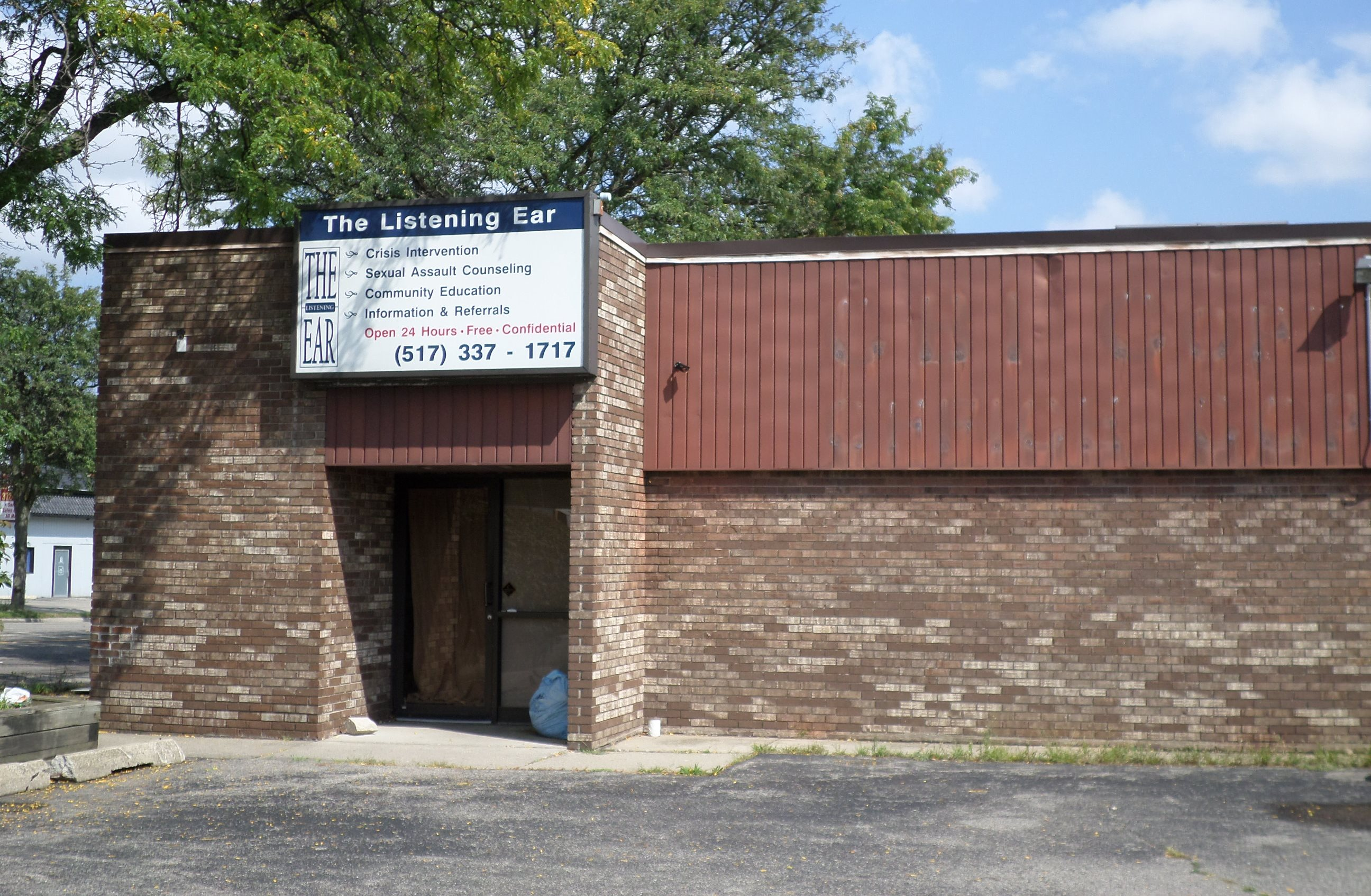
The Listening Ear headquarters in September 2015

The Listening Ear Crisis Intervention Center was a crisis hotline and crisis counseling service based in East Lansing, Michigan. Serving the Greater Lansing area, The Listening Ear was the oldest all-volunteer crisis center operating in the United States until it shut down in 2025. The Listening Ear Crisis Intervention Center was open 24 hours a day, 365 days a year from July 15, 1969, to July 15, 2025, and had served more than 300,000 phone and walk-in clients. The center provided free and confidential service for telephone and walk-in clients in crisis. The center also provided free sexual assault counseling, advocacy and community education to survivors of sexual assault and their significant others.

== History ==
The Listening Ear opened its doors at 547 1/2 East Grand River on July 15, 1969. The first training session was designed by Dr. Dozier Thornton, a psychology professor from Michigan State University. The program ran for 40 hours (this quickly grew into the 65+ hour training of today).

The founders decided that they would stay open if they received at least 100 calls each month for the first three months. They received more than 1500. The annual operating budget was about $6000.

In July 1976, The Rape Counseling program, was established, providing free, short-term counseling to sexual assault survivors as well as advocacy and community education.

On April 13, 1990, The Listening Ear was named the 113th of 1000 Points of Light for its "Outstanding efforts in behalf of [the] community" by President George H. W. Bush.

In 2003, the organization's office manager embezzled more than $13,000, an amount greater than 15% of the annual operating budget.

In June 2016, it was discovered that three volunteers at the organization were registered sex offenders taking calls on the hotline. The story was covered locally in the media, which incited some community backlash within the Greater Lansing area, and removal from the Capital Area Sexual Assault Response Team. On June 5, 2016, The Listening Ear removed the three sex offenders from their staff, and implemented a background check policy that precludes sex offenders from volunteering with the agency. It also inspired one state senator to quickly propose legislation to prevent people convicted of sexual assault from volunteering or working at agencies that serve sexual assault survivors and children. This legislation was opposed by the ACLU and by the end of the year was deemed unlikely to pass.

On July 15, 2025, the Listening Ear closed permanently.
