= WLMI =

Grand Ledge, Michigan; United States
- Broadcast area: Lansing metropolitan area
- Frequency: 92.9 MHz
- Branding: Cruisin 92.9

Programming
- Format: Classic Hits

Ownership
- Owner: Midwest Communications
- Sister stations: WJXQ, WQTX, WWDK

History
- First air date: November 1965; 60 years ago (as WCER-FM Charlotte at 92.7)
- Former call signs: WJZL (4/06-10/1/10); WQTX (3/27/01-4/06); WVIC (6/1/97-3/27/01); WMMQ (1979-6/1/97); WCER-FM (1963–1979)
- Former frequencies: 92.7 MHz (1965–2010)
- Call sign meaning: Lansing, MIchigan

Technical information
- Licensing authority: FCC
- Facility ID: 24645
- Class: A
- Power: 5,400 watts
- HAAT: 105 meters (344 ft)
- Transmitter coordinates: 42°43′58″N 84°33′13″W

Links
- Public license information: Public file; LMS
- Webcast: Listen Live
- Website: cruisin929.com/

WLMI (92.9 MHz) is a commercial radio station licensed to Grand Ledge, Michigan, and serving the Lansing metropolitan area. Owned by Midwest Communications, it broadcasts a classic hits radio format branded as "Cruisin 92.9". The studios are on Cedar Street in Holt.

WLMI has an effective radiated power (ERP) of 5,400 watts. The transmitter tower is on West Allegan Street at South Capitol Avenue in Lansing, near the Michigan State Capitol building.

== History ==
=== WCER-FM and WMMQ ===
What is now WLMI began as WCER-FM at 92.7 FM in Charlotte, Michigan. It signed on the air in November, 1965. The station was co-owned with WCER (1390 AM, now Christian-formatted WLCM in Holt). On July 1, 1979, WCER-FM changed its call sign to WMMQ. On September 1 of that year, WMMQ separated programming from its AM sister and aired an adult contemporary and sports radio format as Q92.

By the mid-1980s, WMMQ was struggling in the ratings and losing to its Lansing-based A/C competitors. The station's owners quietly prepared a format change. On April 15, 1985, WMMQ changed to a then brand-new sound called classic rock, making it one of the first FM stations in the United States with such a format. The station was consulted by Fred Jacobs, considered the "Father of Classic Rock." WMMQ played popular songs from the top rock albums of the 1960s and 70s but nothing current or recent. It quickly became one of the most popular stations in mid-Michigan, and Jacobs' first Classic Rock success story.

=== WVIC and WQTX ===
After WMMQ moved to 94.9 FM on June 1, 1997, 92.7 became WVIC. (94.9 was, for many years, WVIC-FM.) The station broadcast intermittently for the next several years. When it was on the air, WVIC aired automated classical music with no announcers and oddly placed legal station identifications, and with no commercials except for public service announcements (PSAs). Oddly, the station actually did show up in the Lansing Arbitron ratings during this time.

From 2001 to 2005, the station was WQTX, airing sports talk as "The Ticket." Shows such as "The Sports Page" with Jack Ebling and Tom Crawford (later at crosstown WILS), "The Sports Inferno" with Mike Valenti (later at WXYT/Detroit), and "Mad Dog & Company" with David "The Mad Dog" DeMarco and longtime producer Brock Palmbos (later at crosstown WVFN) helped to push "The Ticket" ahead of crosstown rival WVFN, in the ratings.

=== WJZL ===
In October 2005, WQTX flipped to Smooth Jazz, adopting Jones Radio Networks' smooth jazz format, and changed call letters to WJZL; the Sports Talk format continued on former simulcast partner WTXQ. In April 2006, 92.1 FM abandoned the Sports Talk format for good as it flipped to Oldies, taking the WQTX calls formerly used on 92.7. WJZL eventually shifted its frequency to 92.9. Following the demise of Jones' Smooth Jazz network in September 2008, WJZL switched over to Broadcast Architecture's "Smooth Jazz Network" programming.

The station operated for many months on 92.9 at reduced power until November 16, 2007, when it was able to broadcast at 5,400 watts. Until the station went to full power, its weak signal was prone to severe fading and co-channel interference from WJZQ-FM in Cadillac, Michigan, even into Clinton County, which is located just north of Lansing. WJZL later enjoyed a much stronger signal in the immediate Lansing area and can be heard as far as Jackson in the south, Howell in the east, and Hastings in the west. The station, along with WJXQ, WVIC, and WQTX, was sold from Rubber City Radio to Midwest Communications in May 2010.

=== WLMI ===
The station changed its call letters to WLMI in October 2010. After playing Christmas music for the holiday season, the station flipped to locally-programmed classic hits on December 27, picking up the format from WQTX's impending switch to country.

On April 25, 2017, Midwest Communications announced that WLMI would switch to Top 40-CHR the next day as i92.9. The contemporary hit sound lasted for three years.

On July 31, 2020, WLMI began running liners promoting that a "revolution" would begin at noon on that day. At that time, after playing "Bang!" by AJR, the station returned to classic hits as "Cruisin' 92.9". The first song on Cruisin' was "Revolution" by The Beatles.
