= KSED =

Coordinates: 34.969°N 111.507°W

- Sedona, Arizona; United States
- Broadcast area: Flagstaff-Prescott, Arizona
- Frequency: 107.5 MHz
- Branding: Kolt Country 107.5

Programming
- Format: Country
- Affiliations: Premiere Networks

Ownership
- Owner: Stone Canyon Media Group; (Stone Canyon of Flagstaff, LLC)
- Sister stations: KBTK, KFLX, KWMX

History
- First air date: 1993
- Call sign meaning: Sedona

Technical information
- Licensing authority: FCC
- Facility ID: 55402
- Class: C
- ERP: 96,000 watts
- HAAT: 446 meters (1,463 ft)

Links
- Public license information: Public file; LMS
- Webcast: Listen live
- Website: koltcountry.com

KSED (107.5 FM) is a radio station licensed to Sedona, Arizona, United States, and serving the Flagstaff-Prescott, Arizona area. Owned by Stone Canyon Media Group, the station broadcasts a country music format.

== History ==
Former logo as 107.5 Kolt Country.

KSED signed on in Spring 1993 by owner Rap Broadcasting of Sedona with a MOR format. The station was sold in March 1993 to Red Rock Broadcasting for $100,000 with owner Tom Rockler and the changed to the country format as 107.5 Kolt Country in Spring 1998. Grenax Broadcasting II, LLC purchased KSED and sister stations from Red Rock Broadcasting in January 2006 for $5.025 Million. On September 24, 2018, Grenax Broadcasting II, LLC, announced plans to sell KSED and sister stations KBTK, KFLX, and KWMX to Stone Canyon Media Group—a group including former executives of Cherry Creek Media, Emmis Communications, and Withers Broadcasting. the purchase was completed in December.

On January 7, 2019, the station dropped its Kolt Country format, and began stunting with a speaking clock counting down to 6:00 a.m. on January 14, 2019 (at which time the station was expected to introduce a new format or other significant change in operations). The nature of the stunt caused concern among residents, to the point that the Flagstaff Police Department had to release a statement asking residents to stop phoning about the broadcasts, as the countdown was a promotional event with no harm intended. At the conclusion of the stunt, the station returned to a country format as The New Kolt @ 107.5, pivoting its playlist to a hot country format with a focus on newer music.
