= Holt Public Schools =

School district in Ingham County, Michigan, USA

Address
- 5780 West Holt Rd. Holt, Ingham, Michigan, 48842; United States

District information
- Type: Public
- Grades: Pre-kindergarten through 12
- Superintendent: Dr. David G. Hornak
- Schools: 9
- Budget: $104,895,000 (2022-2023 expeditures)
- NCES District ID: 2618480

Students and staff
- Students: 4,726 (2024-25)
- Teachers: 287.27 FTE (2024-25)
- Staff: 750.89 FTE (2024-25)
- Student–teacher ratio: 16.45 (2024-25)

Other information
- Website: www.hpsk12.net

Holt Public Schools is a school district in Ingham and Eaton counties in Michigan. It serves the communities of Holt and Dimondale and portions of Delhi Township, Delta Township, and Windsor Township.

== Schools ==
Schools in Holt Public Schools
School	Address	Notes
High School
Holt High School	5885 W. Holt Rd., Holt	Grades 9-12. North Campus, at 5780 West Holt Road, holds some 12th grade classes.
Middle Schools
Holt Junior High School	1784 North Aurelius Road, Holt	Grades 7-8. Built in 1958. Formerly Holt High School.
Washington Woods Middle School	2055 Washington Road, Holt	Grades 5-6
Elementary Schools
Dimondale Elementary School	330 Walnut Street, Dimondale	Grades K-4
Elliott Elementary School	4200 Bond Street, Holt	Grades K-4
Horizon Elementary School	5776 West Holt Road, Holt	Grades K-4
Midway Early Learning Center	4552 Spahr Avenue, Holt	Child care and preschool
Sycamore Elementary School	4429 Sycamore Street, Holt	Grades K-4
Wilcox Elementary School	1650 Laurelwood Road, Holt	Grades K-4
