= WWDK =

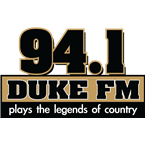
- Jackson, Michigan; United States
- Broadcast area: Lansing, Michigan
- Frequency: 94.1 MHz
- Branding: 94.1 Duke FM

Programming
- Format: Classic Country

Ownership
- Owner: Midwest Communications; (Midwest Communications, Inc.)
- Sister stations: WJXQ, WLMI, WQTX

History
- First air date: July 14, 1958 (as WMKZ-FM)
- Former call signs: WMKZ-FM (1958-?); WBBC (?-?); WHFI (?-11/14/85); WIBM (11/14/85-4/8/87); WIBM-FM (4/8/87-6/24/94); WIBM (6/24/94-11/15-95); WBHR (11/15/95-3/3/97); WXIK (3/3/97-3/27/01); WVIC (3/27/01-3/17/15)
- Call sign meaning: DuKe FM

Technical information
- Licensing authority: FCC
- Facility ID: 55658
- Class: B
- ERP: 40,000 watts
- HAAT: 168 meters (551 ft)
- Transmitter coordinates: 42°23′32″N 84°40′0″W

Links
- Public license information: Public file; LMS
- Webcast: Listen Live
- Website: 941theduke.com

WWDK (94.1 FM "94.1 Duke FM"') is a radio station broadcasting a classic country format. Licensed to Jackson, Michigan, it first began broadcasting on July 14, 1958 as WMKZ-FM. The station broadcasts from a tower near Springport, Michigan.

== History ==
After spending most of the 1960s in simulcast with WIBM (1450 AM) under various call signs (including WMKZ, WIBM-FM, and WBBC), 94.1 separated programming from the AM station in the late 1960s and adopted a separate MOR format, returning to the WBBC calls, and then changing to beautiful music as WHFI in 1974. In 1980, the station returned to the WIBM-FM calls, picking up the Top 40 format (including weekly broadcasts of Casey Kasem's American Top 40) from then-sister WIBM, which flipped to a country format at that time as WXCM. After moving to its current tower site in 1982, WIBM-FM changed its format to gold-based adult contemporary (as "I-94" and then "94 Gold"), and a few years later, would lose AT40 to by-now rival WFMK. By November 1985, the station's format became oldies as "Oldies 94.1," with which the station was successful for a number of years until its November 1995 switch to country as WBHR, "The Bear" (which would change monikers to "Kix 94" two years later under new WXIK call letters). AM 1450 regained the WIBM calls and simulcasted WIBM-FM from 1987 to 1994, at which time the station was sold to Cascades Broadcasting, then-owners of Jackson's other heritage radio station, WKHM; the sale permanently separated ownership of AM 1450 and FM 94.1. In May 2000, the station was sold to Ohio-based Rubber City Radio Group.

On March 27, 2001, WXIK flipped to classic hits as "Rockin' Hits 94.1 WVIC". (The WVIC call sign was used for many years by AM 730 (now WVFN) and WVIC-FM 94.9 (now WMMQ) in East Lansing, as the market's dominant Top 40 music station from the 1970s through the early 1990s, with the new WVIC-FM playing off of that heritage.)

WVIC's format changed from classic hits to AC as "Soft Rock 94.1" at 7 p.m. on October 15, 2007, at which time the station went into Delilah's syndicated love-songs program. WVIC's format also included the Bob and Sheri morning show. In 2007, WVIC was also the first radio station in the Lansing market to change to an all-Christmas music format for the holiday season, as competitor WFMK had never done so in the past.

However, the station was unable to make any inroads against WFMK, and at 9 a.m. on August 17, 2009, the station flipped to a modern rock format as "94.1 The Edge," reviving the format and moniker used for years on sister station WWDX (92.1 FM, now WQTX).

In February 2010, Rubber City announced that they were selling WVIC, as well as WJXQ, WQTX and WLMI to Midwest Communications based in Wausau, Wisconsin. The sale closed and was consummated in May of that year.

On March 16, 2015, WVIC changed their format to classic country, branded as "94.1 Duke FM". The station also changed their call letters to WWDK to go with the "Duke FM" branding.

== Bronco Radio Network ==
WWDK is an affiliate of the Western Michigan University "Broncos Radio Network" and carries all of the Broncos football and men's basketball games.
