= KWMX =

Coordinates: 35.131°N 112.135°W

Williams, Arizona; United States
- Broadcast area: Flagstaff–Prescott, Arizona
- Frequency: 96.7 MHz
- Branding: 96.7 The Wolf

Programming
- Format: Classic rock

Ownership
- Owner: Stone Canyon Media Group; (Stone Canyon of Flagstaff, LLC)
- Sister stations: KBTK, KFLX, KSED

History
- First air date: 1998

Technical information
- Licensing authority: FCC
- Facility ID: 30433
- Class: C2
- ERP: 10,500 watts
- HAAT: 325 meters (1,066 ft)

Links
- Public license information: Public file; LMS
- Webcast: Listen live
- Website: 967thewolf.net

KWMX (96.7 FM, "96.7 The Wolf") is a radio station licensed to Williams, Arizona and serving the Flagstaff–Prescott, Arizona area. Owned by Stone Canyon Media Group, the station broadcasts a classic rock format.

== History ==
KWMX signed on in 1998 broadcasting an oldies music format branded as "Cool 96.7". The station was licensed to Jana Tucker but purchased by Red Rock Communications for $421,400. The station, along with KSED and KBTK was purchased by Grenax Broadcasting II in 2006 for $5.025 Million. On July 1, 2006, it switched to classic rock as "96.7 The Wolf".

On September 24, 2018, Grenax Broadcasting II, LLC announced plans to sell KWMX to Stone Canyon Media Group; the purchase was completed in December.
