= WJIM-FM =

Radio station in Lansing, Michigan

- Lansing, Michigan; United States
- Broadcast area: Lansing-East Lansing metropolitan area
- Frequency: 97.5 MHz
- Branding: 975 Now FM

Programming
- Format: Top 40 (CHR)
- Affiliations: Compass Media Networks

Ownership
- Owner: Townsquare Media; (Townsquare License, LLC)
- Sister stations: WFMK, WITL-FM, WJIM, WMMQ, WVFN

History
- First air date: June 1960
- Call sign meaning: JIM Gross, son of original owner Harold Gross

Technical information
- Licensing authority: FCC
- Facility ID: 17386
- Class: B
- ERP: 45,000 watts
- HAAT: 156 meters
- Transmitter coordinates: 42°40′33″N 84°30′0″W

Links
- Public license information: Public file; LMS
- Webcast: Listen Live
- Website: 975now.com

WJIM-FM (97.5 MHz, "975 Now FM") is a radio station in Lansing, Michigan, broadcasting a top 40 (CHR) format. It is owned by Townsquare Media and has an ERP of 45,000 watts, making it a class B radio station

== History ==
The station has had the WJIM-FM calls continuously since it signed on in 1960. For over three decades, WJIM-FM broadcast an easy listening/beautiful music format, which evolved during the early 1990s into a soft adult contemporary sound. On Labor Day in 1995, WJIM-FM switched from AC to "Oldies 97.5." The change came days after WIBM dropped its longtime oldies format in favor of country to compete with WITL-FM. The station's "good times and great oldies" format was very popular in Lansing for over a decade, with the station consistently rated in the top ten (and frequently the top five) 12+ in the Arbitron ratings.

On September 13, 2005, crosstown competitor WHZZ 101.7 FM abruptly flipped from adult-leaning CHR as "Z101.7" to Variety Hits as "Mike FM." WJIM-FM stepped in to fill the Top 40 void in the market two days later, as "Oldies 97.5" signed off with Don McLean's "American Pie" at 10 a.m. on September 15 and "The New 97-5" (usually just called "97.5, Lansing's New Hit Music Station") debuted in its place. Longtime "Oldies 97.5" morning man Rich Michaels moved to sister station WMMQ. On September 7, 2007, the station repositioned from "The New 97-5" to "97-5 Now FM."

The WJIM call letters have a history in Lansing of being associated with Top 40 music, as WJIM-AM 1240 was a leading Top 40 station in Lansing during the 1960s as "Big Jim 1240."

On August 30, 2013, a deal was announced in which Townsquare Media would acquire 53 Cumulus Media stations, including WJIM-FM, for $238 million. The deal was part of Cumulus' acquisition of Dial Global; Townsquare and Dial Global were both controlled by Oaktree Capital Management. The sale to Townsquare was completed on November 14, 2013.

Since being rebranded as "97-5 Now FM," WJIM-FM has evolved into a rhythmic-leaning CHR as so to avoid overlap with sister station WFMK, and as a result, most WFMK artists are not heard on WJIM-FM. WJIM-FM plays songs from hip-hop artists to make up for this.
