= WJIM (AM) =

Radio station in Lansing, Michigan

- Lansing, Michigan; United States
- Broadcast area: Lansing–East Lansing metropolitan area
- Frequency: 1240 kHz
- Branding: 1240 & 106.9 The Ticket

Programming
- Format: Sports
- Network: 97.1 Detroit Sports Radio Network
- Affiliations: ESPN Radio; Detroit Tigers Radio Network

Ownership
- Owner: Townsquare Media; (Townsquare License, LLC)
- Sister stations: WFMK, WITL-FM, WJIM-FM, WMMQ, WVFN

History
- First air date: August 22, 1934
- Former frequencies: 1210 kHz (1934–1941)
- Call sign meaning: Jim Gross, son of original owner Harold Gross

Technical information
- Licensing authority: FCC
- Facility ID: 17382
- Class: C
- Power: 890 watts
- Transmitter coordinates: 42°43′12″N 84°31′11″W
- Translator: 106.9 W295BP (Haslett)

Links
- Public license information: Public file; LMS
- Webcast: Listen live
- Website: wjimam.com

WJIM (1240 AM, "1240 & 106.9 The Ticket") is a radio station in Lansing, Michigan. Owned by Townsquare Media, it broadcasts a sports talk format.

Its weekday lineup is supplied by WXYT-FM in Detroit as part of the 97.1 Detroit Sports Radio Network, while it is also an affiliate of ESPN Radio and the Detroit Tigers Radio Network.

WJIM is a Class C station, powered at 890 watts non-directional. Programming is simulcast on FM translator W295BP at 106.9 MHz.

== History ==
=== Early years ===
WJIM signed on the air on August 22, 1934. It broadcast on 1210 kHz with 250 watts daytime and 100 watts at night. WJIM was owned by Harold Gross and his company, Capital Broadcasting. It is the oldest commercial station in Lansing. The capital's first radio station, WHW, folded in 1923.

According to local legend, Gross won the license, the oldest continually operated commercial license in Lansing, in a card game. He named the station after his son Jim, who would become the station's general manager from the 1960s through the sale of the station.

In 1941, as part of the North American Regional Broadcasting Agreement (NARBA), WJIM moved to 1240 kHz with 250 watts. That year, many AM station were required to change their frequencies.

=== FM station ===
In July 1941, WJIM was issued an FCC construction permit for a new commercial FM station with the call sign W77XL. However, the station was never completed and the FCC deleted it a little over a year later in September 1942.

In 1960, WJIM again got FCC permission to build an FM station that became 97.5 WJIM-FM. After initially simulcasting programming from AM 1240, WJIM-FM switched to beautiful music and is today a Top 40 station.

=== Full service radio ===
From the 1950s through the 80s, WJIM had a full service middle of the road format and was an NBC Radio News network affiliate. But as music listening shifted to FM radio in the 1980s, WJIM added more talk shows, including NBC Talknet. In the 1990s, it made the transition to all talk programming.

One of WJIM's hallmarks for most of its existence was extensive news coverage. It spawned Lansing's first television station, WJIM-TV (channel 6, now WLNS-TV) in 1950. The two stations combined forces to cover Central Michigan news. In recent years, following the sale to Cumulus and then Townsquare, the station's news department was eliminated. The station now only airs syndicated state and national newscasts, leaving competitor 1320 WILS as the only remaining radio station in the market covering local news.

Logo before translator sign on

=== Changes in ownership ===
WJIM was sold in March 1993 to Liggett Broadcasting. Liggett's stations were sold to Citadel Broadcasting in 2000, with Liggett becoming a member of Citadel's board of directors.

Citadel was acquired by Cumulus Media Cumulus Media in 2011.

On August 30, 2013, a deal was announced in which Townsquare would acquire 53 stations, including WJIM, for $238 million. The deal was part of Cumulus' acquisition of Dial Global; Townsquare and Dial Global were both controlled by Oaktree Capital Management. The sale to Townsquare was completed on November 14, 2013.

=== The Big Talker ===
Starting under Liggett's ownership, WJIM transitioned from full-service radio to talk radio, a format that would continue through the next three owners. The station was branded as "Lansing's Big Talker" and included nationally syndicated such as Paul Harvey, Rush Limbaugh, and Sean Hannity.

Under Cumulus ownership, WJIM dropped Hannity's show in 2013, in favor of Michael Savage, part of a nationwide shakeup of talk stations owned by Cumulus. Hannity was since picked up by competitor WILS in Lansing.

Following Rush Limbaugh's death in 2021, the station added the relatively new Markley, Van Camp & Robbins show from Compass Media Networks to the 12-3pm time slot.

Under the former news-talk format, WJIM also aired The Ramsey Show with Dave Ramsey, Michigan's Big Show Starring Michael Patrick Shiels, The Mark Levin Show, The Joe Pags Show, Our American Stories with Lee Habeeb and Red Eye Radio. Weekends featured shows on money, health, religion, cars, travel and the outdoors. WJIM was a network affiliate of ABC News Radio.

=== The Ticket ===
In November 2025, Audacy, Inc. announced that it would form a statewide sports radio network featuring the local programming of Detroit's WXYT-FM, with four Townsquare Media stations—including WJIM—forming its initial affiliation base. On December 1, 2025, WJIM flipped to sports radio as 1240 & 106.9 The Ticket. Sister station WVFN would concurrently drop its own sports talk format and flip to talk radio to supplant WJIM, taking on morning host Steve Gruber, Michigan's Big Show, The Ramsey Show, and Red Eye Radio, as well as rights to the Michigan State Spartans radio network. In the 2026 season, WJIM became the local affiliate of the Detroit Tigers radio network.
