= Dimondale, Michigan =

- Village
- Location of Dimondale, in Eaton County, Michigan
- Coordinates: 42°38′46″N 84°38′52″W
- Country: United States
- State: Michigan
- County: Eaton

Area
  - Total: 0.93 sq mi (2.42 km^{2})
  - Land: 0.89 sq mi (2.31 km^{2})
  - Water: 0.042 sq mi (0.11 km^{2})
- Elevation: 863 ft (263 m)

Population (2020)
  - Total: 1,134
  - Density: 1,273.4/sq mi (491.68/km^{2})
- Time zone: UTC-5 (Eastern (EST))
  - Summer (DST): UTC-4 (EDT)
- ZIP code: 48821
- Area code: 517
- FIPS code: 26-22380
- GNIS feature ID: 0624685
- Website: www.villageofdimondale.org

Dimondale is a village in Eaton County in the U.S. state of Michigan. The population was 1,134 at the 2020 census. The village is located within Windsor Charter Township. Dimondale is a suburb of Lansing, which is northeast of the village in Ingham County.

== History ==
The Potawatomi originally had a permanent camp along the Grand River in the Dimondale area before white settlement began in the 1830s. Relations between white settlers (most of whom were from New York and New England) and the Potowatomie were generally cordial with local residents permanently deeding 10 acres (40,000 m^{2}) of land near the river to the local Indians. The local band held the deed to the leased land until the Potowatomie were forced west by the Indian Removal Act.

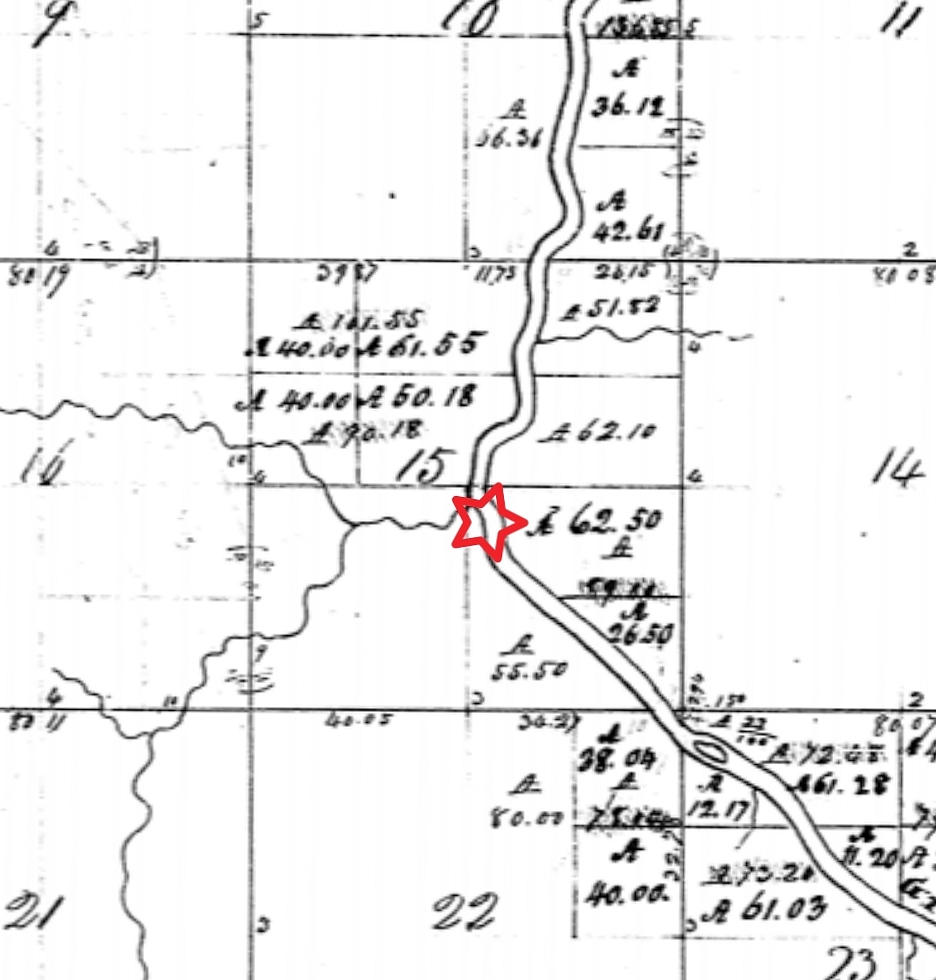
Site of Grand River dam (star) built by I. Dimond in 1850, on a 1827 survey map by M. Evans of section 15 of Windsor township, Eaton County, Michigan

Isaac M. Dimond came to the area in 1848 and, as one of his enterprises, in 1850 began to construct a dam, just east of Silver Creek on the Grand River near the center of section 15 of Windsor Township. By 1852, the dam was completed and a saw mill was in operation. He built a grist mill in 1856. On August 6, 1856, Hosey Harvey surveyed the village in order for Dimond to have it platted with the name "Dimondale". An unusual feature of the village plat was that its streets ran Northeast to Southwest (e.g., Bridge St.) and Northwest to Southeast, while most roads in the surrounding area in Michigan ran north–south and east–west. Its borders make a rough diamond shape on a map.

A post office named "East Windsor" had been established in the eastern part of Windsor Township in about 1860. This office was transferred to Dimondale and renamed in 1872. In 1878 the Lake Shore and Michigan Southern Railway came through and the area was given a station referring to it as Dimondale. By 1880 the settlement had seven shops: a sawmill, a grist mill, two millinery shops, a planing mill, and several machine shops. In 1906, Dimondale incorporated as a village.

From 1929 to 1963, Dimondale had its own high school, until it merged with the Holt School District. This occurred after the school district ran into tax issues due to the sparse business landscape in the village.

In 1962, Interstate 96 was built through Windsor Township, bringing many new businesses to the area.

== Geography ==
According to the United States Census Bureau, the village has a total area of 0.94 square miles (2.43 km^{2}), of which 0.90 square miles (2.33 km^{2}) is land and 0.04 square miles (0.10 km^{2}) is water.

== Demographics ==
Historical population
Census	Pop.	Note	%±
1880	304		—
1890	320		5.3%
1910	341		—
1920	300		−12.0%
1930	545		81.7%
1940	604		10.8%
1950	774		28.1%
1960	866		11.9%
1970	970		12.0%
1980	1,008		3.9%
1990	1,247		23.7%
2000	1,342		7.6%
2010	1,234		−8.0%
2020	1,134		−8.1%
U.S. Decennial Census

=== 2010 census ===
As of the census of 2010, there were 1,234 people, 504 households, and 351 families living in the village. The population density was 1,371.1 inhabitants per square mile (529.4/km^{2}). There were 530 housing units at an average density of 588.9 per square mile (227.4/km^{2}). The racial makeup of the village was 92.7% White, 0.7% African American, 0.9% Native American, 0.8% Asian, 1.6% from other races, and 3.2% from two or more races. Hispanic or Latino of any race were 4.1% of the population.

There were 504 households, of which 28.0% had children under the age of 18 living with them, 57.5% were married couples living together, 9.3% had a female householder with no husband present, 2.8% had a male householder with no wife present, and 30.4% were non-families. 25.8% of all households were made up of individuals, and 13.1% had someone living alone who was 65 years of age or older. The average household size was 2.43 and the average family size was 2.89.

The median age in the village was 47 years. 21.1% of residents were under the age of 18; 6.8% were between the ages of 18 and 24; 19.3% were from 25 to 44; 36.7% were from 45 to 64, and 16.3% were 65 years of age or older. The gender makeup of the village was 47.2% male and 52.8% female.

=== 2000 census ===
As of the census of 2000, there were 1,342 people, 473 households, and 376 families living in the village. The population density was 1,383.5 inhabitants per square mile (534.2/km^{2}). There were 485 housing units at an average density of 500.0 per square mile (193.1/km^{2}). The racial makeup of the village was 96.4% White, 0.8% African American, 0.8% Native American, 0.2% Asian, 0.8% from other races, and 1.2% from two or more races. Hispanic or Latino of any race were 2.9% of the population.

There were 473 households, out of which 42.5% had children under the age of 18 living with them, 67.4% were married couples living together, 9.5% had a female householder with no husband present, and 20.3% were non-families. 15.9% of all households were made up of individuals, and 4.7% had someone living alone who was 65 years of age or older. The average household size was 2.82 and the average family size was 3.19.

In the village, the population was spread out, with 29.4% under the age of 18, 7.5% from 18 to 24, 28.6% from 25 to 44, 25.9% from 45 to 64, and 8.6% who were 65 years of age or older. The median age was 38 years. For every 100 females, there were 94.2 males. For every 100 females age 18 and over, there were 91.5 males.

The median income for a household in the village was $57,917, and the median income for a family was $64,444. Males had a median income of $49,318 versus $30,380 for females. The per capita income for the village was $23,611. About 2.5% of families and 3.7% of the population were below the poverty line, including 4.4% of those under age 18 and 3.2% of those age 65 or over.

== Education ==
Holt Public Schools operates Dimondale Elementary School. Holt High School is the Holt district's high school.

== Climate ==
This climatic region is typified by large seasonal temperature differences, with warm to hot (and often humid) summers and cold (sometimes severely cold) winters. According to the Köppen Climate Classification system, Dimondale has a humid continental climate, abbreviated "Dfb" on climate maps.
