= Michael Patrick Shiels =

Michael Patrick Shiels is a radio personality and author from the US state of Michigan. He is the host of Michigan's Big Show Starring Michael Patrick Shiels, heard on twelve Michigan radio stations. He is also known for authoring books with Donald Trump, Larry King, Arthur Hills, and Ben Wright.

== Media career ==
=== Writing ===
Shiels has written for newspapers and magazines on golf and travel. His articles have appeared in publications including the Los Angeles Times, Cigar Aficionado, Travel + Leisure, AAA Michigan Living, Singapore's SC Magazine, Bermuda Royal Gazette, Honolulu Star-Bulletin, Automotive News, Traverse Magazine, Lake Magazine, Traverse City Record-Eagle, Booth Newspapers, The Detroit News, Detroit Free Press, Heritage Newspapers, Sports Illustrated, Golf Magazine, and more.

=== Radio ===
Shiels was the long-time producer for Detroit's legendary radio host, J.P. McCarthy at WJR. He began hosting the Michigan Talk Network's morning show in 2005 until his departure from WJIM and MTN in February 2012. Just over two months later, Shiels returned to radio as host of "Michigan's Big Show Starring Michael Patrick Shiels", a production of Spotlight Media Marketing and Productions, which is owned by former WJIM Account Executive Suzanne Huard.

Since 2012, "Michigan's Big Show Starring Michael Patrick Shiels" has continued to grow, and now airs on twelve radio station signals throughout the Lower Peninsula of Michigan. The program continues to make headlines with newsmaker interviews with Michigan politicians.

'MPS' won the "Network Radio Personality of the Year" award from the Michigan Association of Broadcasters in both 2007 and 2008.

== Bibliography ==
Non-Fiction

- Shiels, Michael Patrick (1997). J.P. McCarthy... Just Don't Tell 'em Where I Am. Farmington Hills, Michigan: Sleeping Bear Press. ISBN 978-1-886947-24-5.
- ——— (1999). Good Bounces and Bad Lies - The Biography of Ben Wright. Farmington Hills, Michigan: Sleeping Bear Press. ISBN 978-1-886947-22-1.
- ——— (2000). Speak Wright: A Literary Guide to the Game of Golf. New York: Clocktower Press. ISBN 978-1-58536-008-6.
- ——— (2003). Works of Art: Golf Course Designs by Arthur Hills. Virginia Beach, Virginia: Donning Publishers. ISBN 978-1-57864-233-5.
- ——— (2005). Golf's Short Game For Dummies. Hoboken, New Jersey: Wiley Publications. ISBN 978-0-7645-6920-3.
- ——— (2008). Secrets of the Great Golf Course Architects: A Treasury of the World's Greatest Golf Courses by History's Master Designers. New York: Skyhorse Publishing. ISBN 978-1-60239-326-4.
