= WVFN =

- East Lansing, Michigan; United States
- Broadcast area: Lansing-East Lansing metropolitan area
- Frequency: 730 kHz
- Branding: Lansing 730 AM

Programming
- Format: Talk radio
- Affiliations: Compass Media Networks; Westwood One; Spartan Sports Network

Ownership
- Owner: Townsquare Media; (Townsquare License, LLC)
- Sister stations: WFMK, WITL-FM, WJIM, WJIM-FM, WMMQ

History
- First air date: January 20, 1965
- Former call signs: WVIC (1965–1981, 1983–1989, 1989–1992); WVGO (1981–1983); WAAP (1989)
- Call sign meaning: Former "Fan" branding

Technical information
- Licensing authority: FCC
- Facility ID: 24638
- Class: D
- Power: 500 watts (day); 50 watts (night)
- Transmitter coordinates: 42°38′45″N 84°33′39″W

Links
- Public license information: Public file; LMS
- Webcast: Listen live
- Website: lansing730.com

WVFN (730 AM, "Lansing 730") is a radio station licensed to East Lansing, Michigan. Owned by Townsquare Media, it broadcasts a talk radio format featuring a mix of local and syndicated hosts. Its studios and offices are co-located with its sister stations on Pinetree Road in Lansing. WVFN is powered at 500 watts during the day. As 730 AM is a Mexican and Canadian clear-channel frequency, the station must power down to 50 watts at night.

== History ==
WVFN began broadcasting as WVIC in 1965 with a Middle-of-the-Road (MOR) format, as sister station WVIC-FM programmed a Beautiful Music format. WVIC and WVIC-FM adopted a full-time Top 40 format in 1968, competing with cross-town rivals WJIM and WILS. WVIC and WVIC-FM would simulcast the Top 40 format full-time for most of the 1970s, eventually leading WVIC-FM to beat out its AM competitors with the advantage of a 24-hour FM stereo signal. WVIC, during this time, was licensed to operate from 6:00 am to local sunset, and aired a promotional announcement at nightly sign-off, encouraging listeners to tune to WVIC-FM. WVIC made a partial break in their simulcast with WVIC-FM in 1979, airing an Urban Contemporary format during the midday, while continuing to simulcast WVIC-FM for the remainder of the broadcast day.

WVFN Logo as "The Game"

WVIC and WVIC-FM were purchased by Goodrich Broadcasting in August 1981, and WVIC was reprogrammed with Al Hamm's Music of Your Life format, featuring Big Band music from the 1940s, along with vocal standards from the 1950s and 1960s. Along with the format change came a call-sign change to WVGO. Less than two years later in July 1983, the Music of Your Life format was abandoned, the WVIC call-sign was restored, and the station returned to a Top 40 simulcast with WVIC-FM as "The New 73 AM". The simulcast would continue until May 1992, when a sports talk format was introduced under the call-sign WVFN.

Goodrich Broadcasting changed the call-sign of WVIC to WAAP for a brief period in 1989, apparently to prevent cross-town rival WLNZ (The Ape 92) from acquiring the same call-sign (WLNZ later changed its call-sign to WGOR). There were no programming changes made to WVIC during this period.

Between 1972 and 1976, the original use of the WVFN (“Voice of the Forty-Niners”) call letters were assigned to a 10-watt AM carrier current campus radio station (710 kHz) at the University of North Carolina at Charlotte in Charlotte, NC.

By 2025, the station had been running a sports talk format branded as The Game, featuring ESPN Radio programming and local hosts such as Tim Staudt, and the Michigan-based syndicated program The Huge Show with Bill Simonson. In November 2025, Townsquare announced that the sports format would move to sister station WJIM on December 1 as part of a new WXYT-FM/Detroit-led network, and that WVFN would concurrently flip to talk radio as Lansing 730. The new lineup combined WJIM programs into WVFN's schedule, including morning host Steve Gruber and Michigan's Big Show starring Michael Patrick Shiels, alongside Staudt on Sports, Matt Shepard, and The Huge Show (which air in mid-mornings, afternoons, and nights respectively). The Ramsey Show and Red Eye Radio fill the overnight schedule formerly filled by ESPN Radio programming, while rights to the Michigan State Spartans radio network also moved to WVFN.
