= Holt High School (Michigan) =

Location
- 5885 Holt Road; Holt, Michigan 48842; United States
- 42°38′17″N 84°34′33″W

Information
- School type: public high school
- School district: Holt Public Schools
- Principal: Michael P. Willard
- Teaching staff: 89.32 (FTE)
- Grades: 9 – 12
- Enrollment: 1,569 (2023-2024)
- Student to teacher ratio: 17.57
- Colors: Brown and Vegas gold
- Nickname: Rams
- Newspaper: Ramparts
- Yearbook: Rampages
- Website: www.hpsk12.net/our-schools/high-school/

Holt High School is a public secondary school in Holt, Michigan, United States. It serves grades 9–12 for the Holt Public Schools.

== Facilities ==
The current Holt High School building opened in fall 2003, though the district itself opened around the 1920s. The architecture was meant to evoke the Collegiate Gothic style of Michigan State University. It was designed by TMP Architecture.

== Athletics ==
Holt has won a four state championships in Wrestling (1971, 1996, 1997, 2008).
