= Kachina Village, Arizona =

CDP in Coconino County, Arizona

- CDP
- Location in Coconino County and the state of Arizona

- Location in the United States
- Coordinates: 35°05′42″N 111°41′33″W
- Country: United States
- State: Arizona
- County: Coconino

Area
  - Total: 1.17 sq mi (3.04 km^{2})
  - Land: 1.17 sq mi (3.03 km^{2})
  - Water: 0 sq mi (0.00 km^{2})
- Elevation: 6,798 ft (2,072 m)

Population (2020)
  - Total: 2,502
  - Density: 2,135.4/sq mi (824.47/km^{2})
- Time zone: UTC-7 (MST)
- ZIP code: 86005
- Area code: 928
- FIPS code: 04-36475
- GNIS feature ID: 2408458

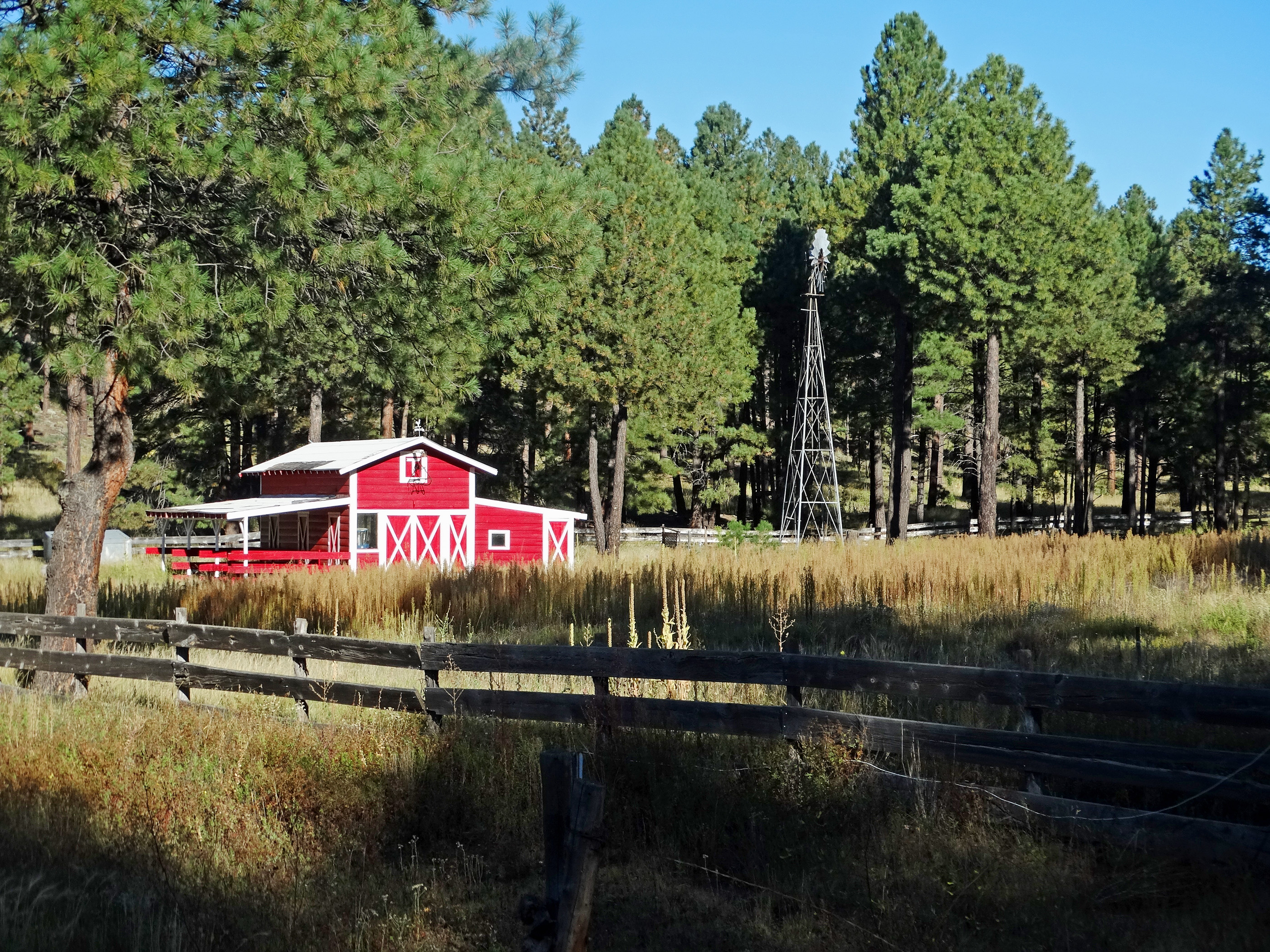
Red barn near Kachina Village off SR-89A

Kachina Village is a census-designated place (CDP) in Coconino County, Arizona, United States. The population was 2,502 at the 2020 census, down from 2,622 at the 2010 census. Kachina Village is primarily a bedroom community for Flagstaff.

== Geography ==
According to the United States Census Bureau, the CDP has a total area of 1.2 square miles (3.1 km^{2}), all land.

=== Climate ===
This region experiences warm (but not hot) and dry summers, with no average monthly temperatures above 71.6 °F. According to the Köppen Climate Classification system, Kachina Village has a dry-summer continental climate, abbreviated "Dsb" on climate maps.

Climate data for Kachina Village, AZ (1991-2020)
Month	Jan	Feb	Mar	Apr	May	Jun	Jul	Aug	Sep	Oct	Nov	Dec	Year
Mean daily maximum °F (°C)	44.5 (6.9)	47.1 (8.4)	53.4 (11.9)	60.2 (15.7)	69.1 (20.6)	80.3 (26.8)	83.4 (28.6)	80.7 (27.1)	75.6 (24.2)	65.4 (18.6)	53.7 (12.1)	44.4 (6.9)	63.2 (17.3)
Daily mean °F (°C)	31.5 (−0.3)	33.6 (0.9)	38.9 (3.8)	44.4 (6.9)	52.4 (11.3)	62.4 (16.9)	67.8 (19.9)	65.8 (18.8)	59.6 (15.3)	49.1 (9.5)	39.1 (3.9)	31.2 (−0.4)	48.0 (8.9)
Mean daily minimum °F (°C)	18.4 (−7.6)	20.2 (−6.6)	24.4 (−4.2)	28.7 (−1.8)	35.7 (2.1)	44.4 (6.9)	52.1 (11.2)	50.9 (10.5)	43.5 (6.4)	32.9 (0.5)	24.6 (−4.1)	18.0 (−7.8)	32.8 (0.5)
Average precipitation inches (mm)	2.50 (64)	2.66 (68)	2.40 (61)	1.11 (28)	0.70 (18)	0.33 (8.4)	2.25 (57)	2.82 (72)	1.94 (49)	1.60 (41)	1.54 (39)	2.22 (56)	22.07 (561.4)
Average dew point °F (°C)	17.6 (−8.0)	18.8 (−7.3)	20.3 (−6.5)	20.3 (−6.5)	25.3 (−3.7)	27.4 (−2.6)	43.1 (6.2)	47.4 (8.6)	39.3 (4.1)	27.2 (−2.7)	20.4 (−6.4)	16.5 (−8.6)	27.0 (−2.8)
Source: PRISM Climate Group

== Demographics ==
Historical population
Census	Pop.	Note	%±
2010	2,622		—
2020	2,502		−4.6%
U.S. Decennial Census

=== 2020 census ===
As of the 2020 census, Kachina Village had a population of 2,502. The median age was 41.1 years. 19.1% of residents were under the age of 18 and 16.4% of residents were 65 years of age or older. For every 100 females there were 110.1 males, and for every 100 females age 18 and over there were 107.7 males age 18 and over.

0.0% of residents lived in urban areas, while 100.0% lived in rural areas.

There were 1,034 households in Kachina Village, of which 28.1% had children under the age of 18 living in them. Of all households, 47.1% were married-couple households, 21.2% were households with a male householder and no spouse or partner present, and 20.2% were households with a female householder and no spouse or partner present. About 25.8% of all households were made up of individuals and 9.2% had someone living alone who was 65 years of age or older.

There were 1,327 housing units, of which 22.1% were vacant. The homeowner vacancy rate was 1.9% and the rental vacancy rate was 7.3%.

Racial composition as of the 2020 census
Race	Number	Percent
White	1,955	78.1%
Black or African American	20	0.8%
American Indian and Alaska Native	165	6.6%
Asian	20	0.8%
Native Hawaiian and Other Pacific Islander	0	0.0%
Some other race	89	3.6%
Two or more races	253	10.1%
Hispanic or Latino (of any race)	318	12.7%

=== 2000 census ===
As of the census of 2000, there were 2,664 people, 1,021 households, and 658 families residing in the CDP. The population density was 2,228.3 inhabitants per square mile (860.4/km^{2}). There were 1,376 housing units at an average density of 1,151.0 per square mile (444.4/km^{2}). The racial makeup of the CDP was 89.0% White, 4.3% Native American, 0.3% Black or African American, 0.3% Asian, <0.1% Pacific Islander, 4.8% from other races, and 1.3% from two or more races. 9.7% of the population were Hispanic or Latino of any race.

There were 1,021 households, out of which 33.5% had children under the age of 18 living with them, 52.4% were married couples living together, 8.1% had a female householder with no husband present, and 35.5% were non-families. 20.0% of all households were made up of individuals, and 2.1% had someone living alone who was 65 years of age or older. The average household size was 2.61 and the average family size was 3.08.

In the CDP, the age distribution of the population shows 26.0% under the age of 18, 9.5% from 18 to 24, 37.4% from 25 to 44, 22.6% from 45 to 64, and 4.5% who were 65 years of age or older. The median age was 33 years. For every 100 females, there were 107.3 males. For every 100 females age 18 and over, there were 109.6 males.

The median income for a household in the CDP was $45,703, and the median income for a family was $51,037. Males had a median income of $34,375 versus $26,750 for females. The per capita income for the CDP was $17,849. About 4.4% of families and 8.4% of the population were below the poverty line, including 10.5% of those under age 18 and none of those age 65 or over.

== Education ==
Kachina Village is served by the Flagstaff Unified School District.

The zoned secondary schools are Mount Elden Middle School and Flagstaff High School.
