= WIBM =

- Jackson, Michigan; United States
- Frequency: 1450 kHz
- Branding: 95.9 The Power Cow

Programming
- Format: Country music
- Affiliations: Premiere Networks

Ownership
- Owner: Jamie McKibbin; (McKibbin Media Group, Inc.)
- Sister stations: WKHM; WKHM-FM

History
- First air date: November 20, 1927
- Former call signs: WIBM (1925–1980); WXCM (1980–1987); WIBM (1987–1994); WCXI (1994–1995)

Technical information
- Licensing authority: FCC
- Facility ID: 9248
- Class: C
- Power: 810 watts
- Transmitter coordinates: 42°13′55″N 84°22′06″W
- Translator: 95.9 W240DG (Jackson)

Links
- Public license information: Public file; LMS
- Webcast: Listen live
- Website: www.959thepowercow.com

WIBM (1450 AM) is a country music radio station in Jackson, Michigan, owned by McKibbin Media Group, Inc. This company also owns news/talk WKHM AM 970 and hot AC WKHM-FM "K105.3". WIBM's programming is also heard on FM via translator W240DG at 95.9 MHz.

== History ==
WIBM was first licensed on June 3, 1925, to Billy Maine in Chicago, Illinois as a portable broadcasting station. The call sign was randomly assigned from a sequential list.

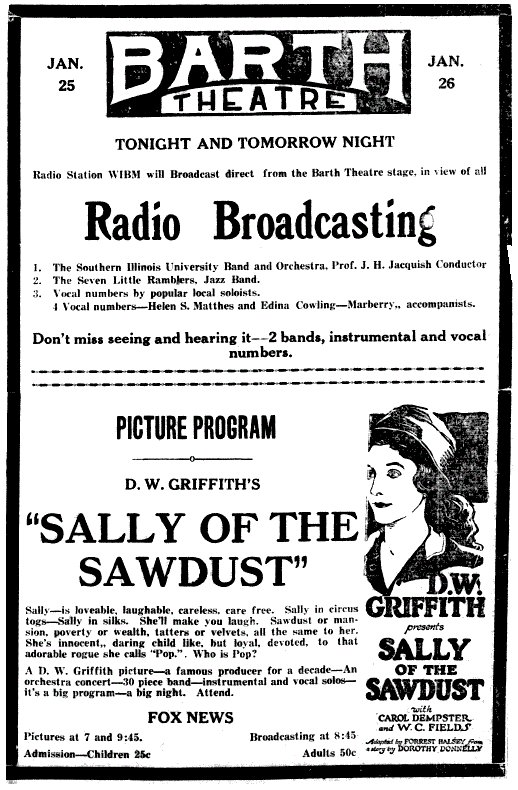
January 1926 advertisement promoting WIBM's theater broadcasts at Carbondale, Illinois

Portable stations could be transported from place-to-place on movable platforms such as trucks. They were commonly hired out for a few weeks at a time to theaters located in small towns that didn't have their own radio stations, to be used for special programs broadcast to the local community.

Toward the end of 1926 ownership of WIBM was transferred to C. L. Carrell of Chicago, Illinois, joining a roster of seven portable stations operated by Carrell. However, due to the difficulty of regulating "moving targets", in May 1927 the newly formed Federal Radio Commission warned that it would soon stop licensing portable facilities. Facing deletion, Carrell arranged for the station to be permanently moved to Jackson, Michigan.

WIBM began broadcasting from Jackson on November 20, 1927, from the 9th floor of the Blake Building (then known as the Reynolds Building). In 1930 station ownership was transferred from C. L. Carrell to WIBM, Incorporated. In 1941, with the implementation of the North American Regional Broadcasting Agreement, WIBM moved from 1370 kHz to the current 1450 kHz. Following several studio moves, the station began operating out of 2511 Kibby Road in September 1948.

Jack Paar, future host of The Tonight Show, was a part-time announcer at the station during the mid-1930s. Another WIBM notable is broadcast consultant Bill Hennes, afternoon drive personality on WIBM during the early 1960s.

In the 1960s and 1970s, WIBM served as the Jackson area's Top 40 music station. Casey Kasem's American Top 40 was heard on WIBM throughout the 1970s. In 1980, the Top 40 format was moved to its FM sister at 94.1 (now WWDK and no longer co-owned), and the AM station became WXCM with a country music format which continued until 1987, when the station went back to the heritage WIBM calls and became a simulcast of the oldies format on 94.1 WIBM-FM.

In 1994, WIBM (AM) was purchased by Cascades Broadcasting, then owners of WKHM-AM and FM, which changed its calls to WCXI and returned to a country format; the WIBM calls returned once again the following year. In 1997 the station picked up the soft AC/easy listening format from sister WKHM-FM after the FM changed to an adult CHR format as "K105.3". WIBM was known as "Easy Relaxed 1450 AM" until adopting an ESPN Radio sports format in March 1999.

In 2014, WIBM became available on AM station 1450 and FM station 101.9.

One of WIBM's most popular shows on ESPN Radio 101.9FM was "The Nooner" with Greg O'Connor. O'Connor, affectionately known as the GOC, has been hosting his afternoon sports show on WIBM since 2000.

On June 30, 2016, WIBM changed their format from sports (which remains on WKHM-HD2 and W270CJ) to country, branded as "95.9 The Power Cow", simulcast on WKHM-HD3 and translator W240DG 95.9 FM Jackson.

Effective December 12, 2019, Jackson Radio Works sold WIBM, two sister stations, and three translators to Jamie McKibbin's McKibbin Media Group, Inc. for $3.8 million.
