= Holt, Michigan =

- Census-designated place (CDP) & unincorporated community
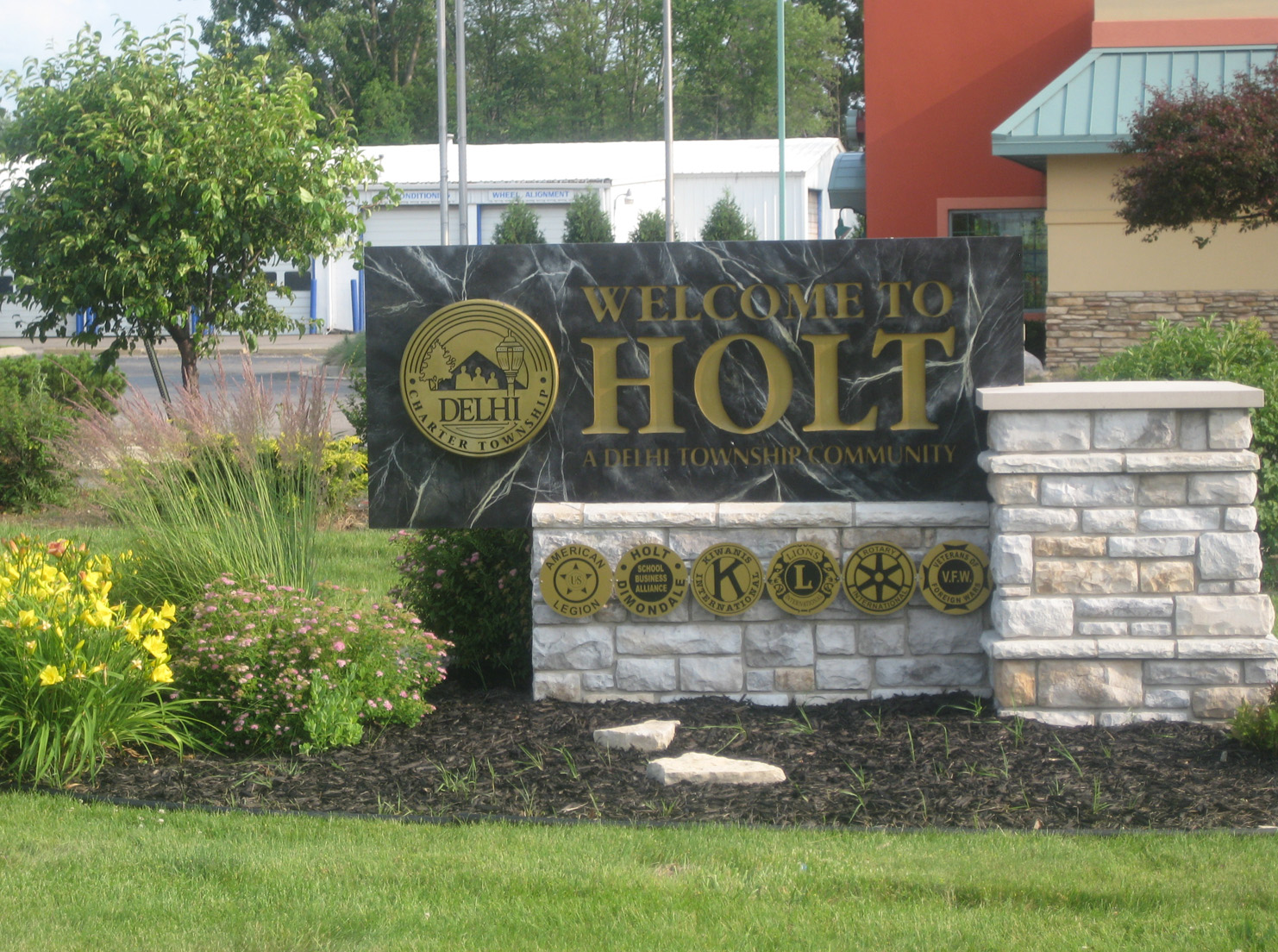
- Holt welcome sign along Cedar Street

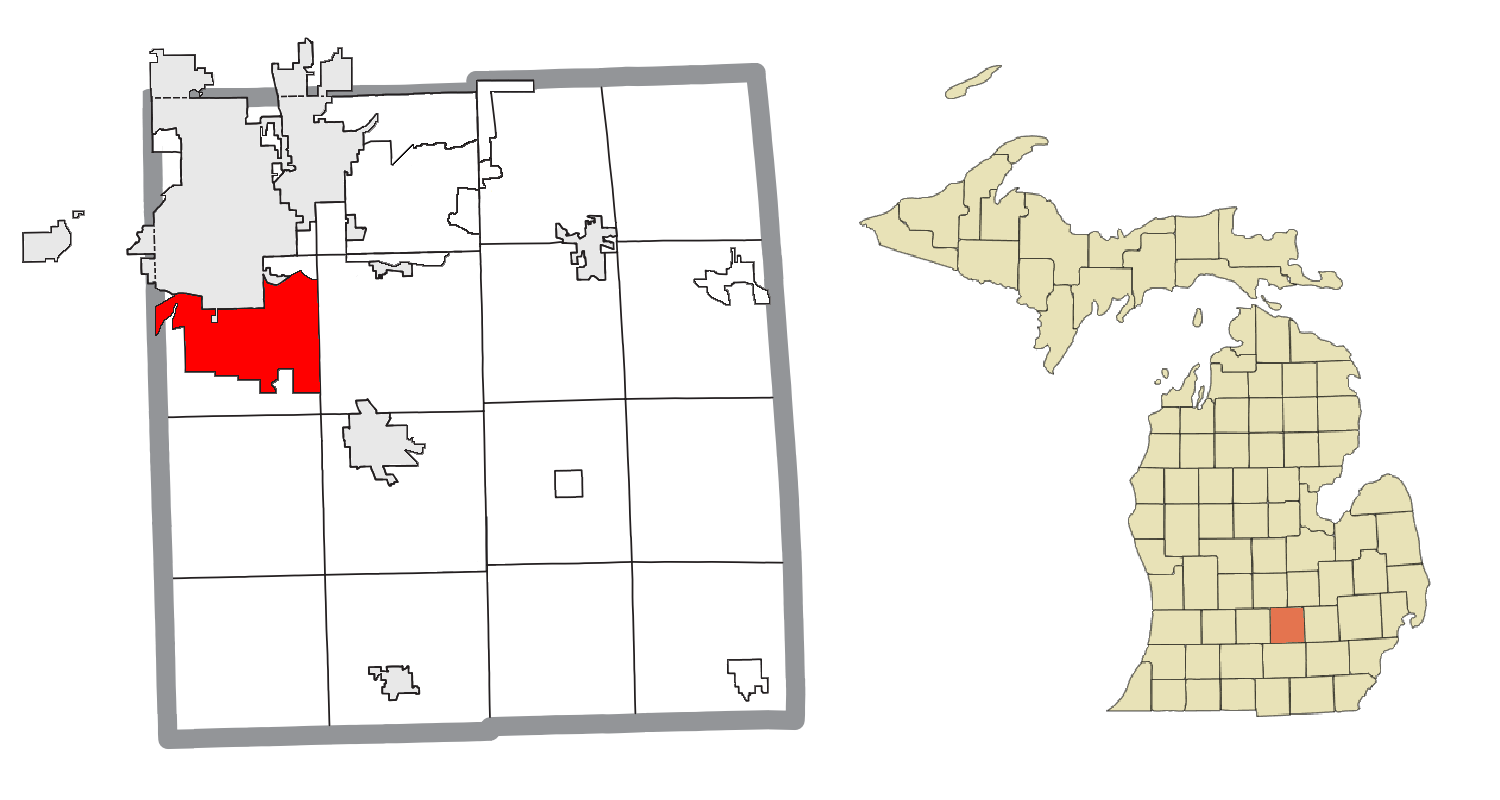
- Location within Ingham County

- Location within the state of Michigan Location within the United States
- Coordinates: 42°38′30″N 84°31′51″W
- Country: United States
- State: Michigan
- County: Ingham
- Township: Delhi
- Established: 1860

Area
  - Total: 15.86 sq mi (41.07 km^{2})
  - Land: 15.66 sq mi (40.56 km^{2})
  - Water: 0.20 sq mi (0.51 km^{2})
- Elevation: 892 ft (272 m)

Population (2020)
  - Total: 25,625
  - Density: 1,636/sq mi (631.8/km^{2})
- Time zone: UTC-5 (Eastern (EST))
  - Summer (DST): UTC-4 (EDT)
- ZIP code(s): 48842; 48911 (Lansing)
- Area code: 517
- FIPS code: 26-38780
- GNIS feature ID: 2393053
- Website: www.delhitownship.com

Holt is an unincorporated community and census-designated place (CDP) in Ingham County in the U.S. state of Michigan. The community is located within Delhi Charter Township and occupies the majority of the township. The population was 25,625 at the 2020 census, which is a significant increase from the population of 11,315 from the 2000 census, when the community was significantly smaller.

== Geography ==
According to the United States Census Bureau, the community has a total area of 15.87 square miles (41.10 km^{2}), of which 15.67 square miles (40.59 km^{2}) is land and 0.20 square miles (0.52 km^{2}) (1.26%) is water. Holt is the second most-populated CDP (after Forest Hills) and the fifth largest by area in the state of Michigan.

The community is south of Lansing, just south of I-96, and is in between US-127 and M-99. The city of Mason is about 6 miles (10 km) southeast, and the village of Dimondale is about 6 miles (10 km) west.

Holt is home to an ancient glacial esker. This esker, the longest in Michigan at roughly 20 miles (32 km), can be traced from south Lansing through Holt to just beyond Mason.

== History ==
The first permanent settlers of Delhi Township, John Norris and Fred Luther, initially arrived there in 1837. In 1850, 402 settlers resided in the township. By 1857, Delhi Center (now Holt) had a post office, hotel, tavern, and several other businesses. The post office at Delhi Center was renamed "Holt" in 1860 to prevent confusion with Delhi Mills in Washtenaw County. Joseph Holt was the U.S. Postmaster General during that time.

The northern part of Holt was originally not a part of the community and was a separate area known as "Five Corners" or "North Holt".

== Demographics ==
Historical population
Census	Pop.	Note	%±
1990	11,744		—
2000	11,315		−3.7%
2010	23,973		111.9%
2020	25,625		6.9%
U.S. Decennial Census

=== 2020 census ===
As of the 2020 census, Holt had a population of 25,625. The median age was 39.1 years. 23.4% of residents were under the age of 18 and 16.5% of residents were 65 years of age or older. For every 100 females there were 92.5 males, and for every 100 females age 18 and over there were 88.6 males age 18 and over.

97.5% of residents lived in urban areas, while 2.5% lived in rural areas.

There were 10,449 households in Holt, of which 30.1% had children under the age of 18 living in them. Of all households, 48.0% were married-couple households, 16.5% were households with a male householder and no spouse or partner present, and 28.7% were households with a female householder and no spouse or partner present. About 28.9% of all households were made up of individuals and 12.1% had someone living alone who was 65 years of age or older.

There were 10,988 housing units, of which 4.9% were vacant. The homeowner vacancy rate was 1.2% and the rental vacancy rate was 7.1%.

Racial composition as of the 2020 census
Race	Number	Percent
White	19,832	77.4%
Black or African American	2,128	8.3%
American Indian and Alaska Native	98	0.4%
Asian	923	3.6%
Native Hawaiian and Other Pacific Islander	10	0.0%
Some other race	479	1.9%
Two or more races	2,155	8.4%
Hispanic or Latino (of any race)	1,648	6.4%

=== 2000 census ===
As of the census of 2000, there were 11,315 people, 4,502 households, and 3,101 families residing in the CDP. The population density was 2,623.2 inhabitants per square mile (1,012.8/km^{2}). There were 4,719 housing units at an average density of 1,094.0 per square mile (422.4/km^{2}). The racial makeup of the CDP was 92.89% White, 2.43% Black or African American, 0.50% Native American, 1.03% Asian, 0.04% Pacific Islander, 0.95% from other races, and 2.15% from two or more races. Hispanic or Latino of any race were 3.63% of the population.

There were 4,502 households, out of which 38.5% had children under the age of 18 living with them, 49.3% were married couples living together, 15.0% had a female householder with no husband present, and 31.1% were non-families. 25.6% of all households were made up of individuals, and 7.0% had someone living alone who was 65 years of age or older. The average household size was 2.51 and the average family size was 3.01.

In the CDP, the population was spread out, with 28.6% under the age of 18, 8.6% from 18 to 24, 31.4% from 25 to 44, 23.0% from 45 to 64, and 8.5% who were 65 years of age or older. The median age was 34 years. For every 100 females, there were 91.3 males. For every 100 females age 18 and over, there were 86.3 males.

The median income for a household in the CDP was $44,382, and the median income for a family was $52,528. Males had a median income of $41,322 versus $30,500 for females. The per capita income for the CDP was $21,733. About 5.1% of families and 6.7% of the population were below the poverty line, including 8.9% of those under age 18 and 4.2% of those age 65 or over.

== Education ==
Holt Public Schools is the local school district, which operates Holt High School.

== Transportation ==
Holt is surrounded by the highways Interstate 96, US-127, and M-99. The Capital Area Transportation Authority (CATA) serves Holt via its Route 8.

== Notable people ==
- Lingg Brewer, Michigan state legislator
- Harry A. DeMaso, Michigan state legislator
- Tim Fedewa, NASCAR driver
- Jim C. Hines, fantasy writer
- Larry Nassar, former team doctor for the United States women's national gymnastics team and convicted sex offender.
- Tina Rosenberg, Pulitzer-prize winning author
- Alfie Turcotte, NHL player
