= WKHM-FM =

Coordinates: 42.154°N 84.402°W

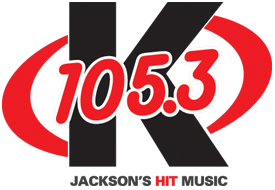

Brooklyn, Michigan; United States
- Broadcast area: Jackson, Michigan
- Frequency: 105.3 MHz (HD Radio)
- Branding: K-105.3

Programming
- Format: Top 40
- Subchannels: HD2: "Fox Sports 101.9" (Sports radio)
- Affiliations: Westwood One

Ownership
- Owner: Jamie McKibbin; (McKibbin Media Group, Inc.)
- Sister stations: WIBM, WKHM

History
- First air date: 1995; 30 years ago
- Call sign meaning: Fred Knorr, Harvey Hansen, Bill McCoy

Technical information
- Licensing authority: FCC
- Facility ID: 9247
- Class: A
- ERP: 2,200 watts
- HAAT: 115 meters (377 ft)
- Translator: HD2: 101.9 W270CJ (Jackson)

Links
- Public license information: Public file; LMS
- Webcast: Listen Live; Listen Live (HD2)
- Website: k1053.com foxsports1019.com (HD2)

WKHM-FM (105.3 MHz "K105.3") is a Contemporary Hit Radio radio station licensed to Brooklyn, Michigan, United States, serving the Jackson area.

== History ==
The WKHM callsign has a long Jackson tradition and is based on the names of the original owners of WKHM AM (Fred Knorr, Harvey Hansen, and Bill McCoy). The first WKHM-FM operated on 106.1 and is now WJXQ.

The current WKHM-FM signed on in 1995 and originally programmed easy listening music, one of the last stations in Michigan to program such a format. "Easy Relaxed 105.3" played a mixture of adult contemporary hits, soft oldies, and smooth jazz. The "easy" format was dropped in early 1998 (moving to sister WIBM 1450 AM for a short time until that station went sports) and K105.3 was born.

== FM translator ==
The WKHM-FM HD2 signal is relayed by an FM translator.

Broadcast translator for WKHM-FMHD2
Call sign	Frequency	City of license	FID	ERP (W)	HAAT	Class	FCC info
W270CJ	101.9 FM	Jackson, Michigan	143034	250	39.1 m (128 ft)	D	LMS

== HD Radio ==
WKHM-FM HD2 airs a sports talk format branded as "Fox Sports 101.9" with programming from Fox Sports Radio, feeding analog translator 101.9 W270CJ.

On May 1, 2014, WKHM-FM launched a country music format on its HD2 subchannel, branded as "Hot Country 101.5," relayed on translator W268CA 101.5 FM Jackson, Michigan. The country format is now heard on WIBM 1450 AM and translator 95.9 W240DG. Programming on 101.5 is now a simulcast of WKHM 970 AM.

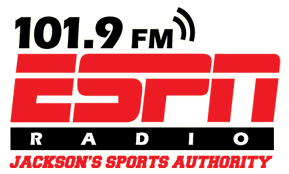
HD2 logo under ESPN Radio affiliation

On October 1, 2020, WKHM-FM HD2 switched affiliations from ESPN Radio to Fox Sports Radio, branded as "Fox Sports 101.9".

== Sources ==
- Michiguide.com – WKHM-FM History
