= WKHM (AM) =

Coordinates: 42°11′39″N 84°25′50″W

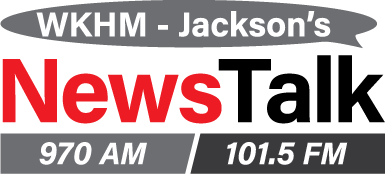
- Jackson, Michigan; United States
- Frequency: 970 kHz
- Branding: News/Talk 970 AM and 101.5 FM

Programming
- Format: Talk radio
- Affiliations: ABC News Radio; Fox News Radio

Ownership
- Owner: Jamie McKibbin; (McKibbin Media Group, Inc.)
- Sister stations: WIBM, WKHM-FM

History
- First air date: December 7, 1951
- Call sign meaning: Fred Knorr, Harvey Hansen, Bill McCoy (original owners)

Technical information
- Licensing authority: FCC
- Facility ID: 9246
- Class: B
- Power: 1,000 watts
- Translator: 101.5 W268CA (Jackson)

Links
- Public license information: Public file; LMS
- Website: wkhm.com

WKHM (970 AM) is a commercial radio station licensed to Jackson, Michigan, United States. It is owned by McKibbin Media Group, Inc., and broadcasts a talk format. Studios, offices and the transmitter are on Glenshire Drive in Jackson.

Programming is also heard on 250-watt FM translator station W268CA at 101.5 MHz.

== History ==
WKHM first signed on the air on December 7, 1951. It offered a full service format of middle of the road music, news, talk and sports. It was originally owned by The Jackson Broadcasting & TV Company. WKHM was a network affiliate of the Mutual Broadcasting System. In 1985, the station was bought by Cascades Broadcasting for $567,000.

It kept the same format for four decades but by the 1990s, as music listening shifted to FM radio, more talk programming was added to WKHM's line up. Jackson Radio Works acquired WKHM in 1997. The new owner completed the transition to full-time talk, eliminating all music programming except for a polka music show still heard on Sunday mornings.

In 2004–2005; and 2011, WKHM won the award of the Michigan Association of Broadcasters "station of the year".

Effective December 12, 2019, Jackson Radio Works sold WKHM, two sister stations, and three translators to Jamie McKibbin's McKibbin Media Group, Inc. for $3.8 million.

== Programming ==
Local personalities on WKHM include Greg O'Connor and Steve Boyle; nationally syndicated programs comprise the remainder of the schedule.

== Sources ==
- Michiguide.com - WKHM History
