= Lansing–East Lansing metropolitan area =

Coordinates: 42°43′22.4″N 84°33′9.7″W

Metro Lansing Lansing–East Lansing MSA
- Metropolitan Area
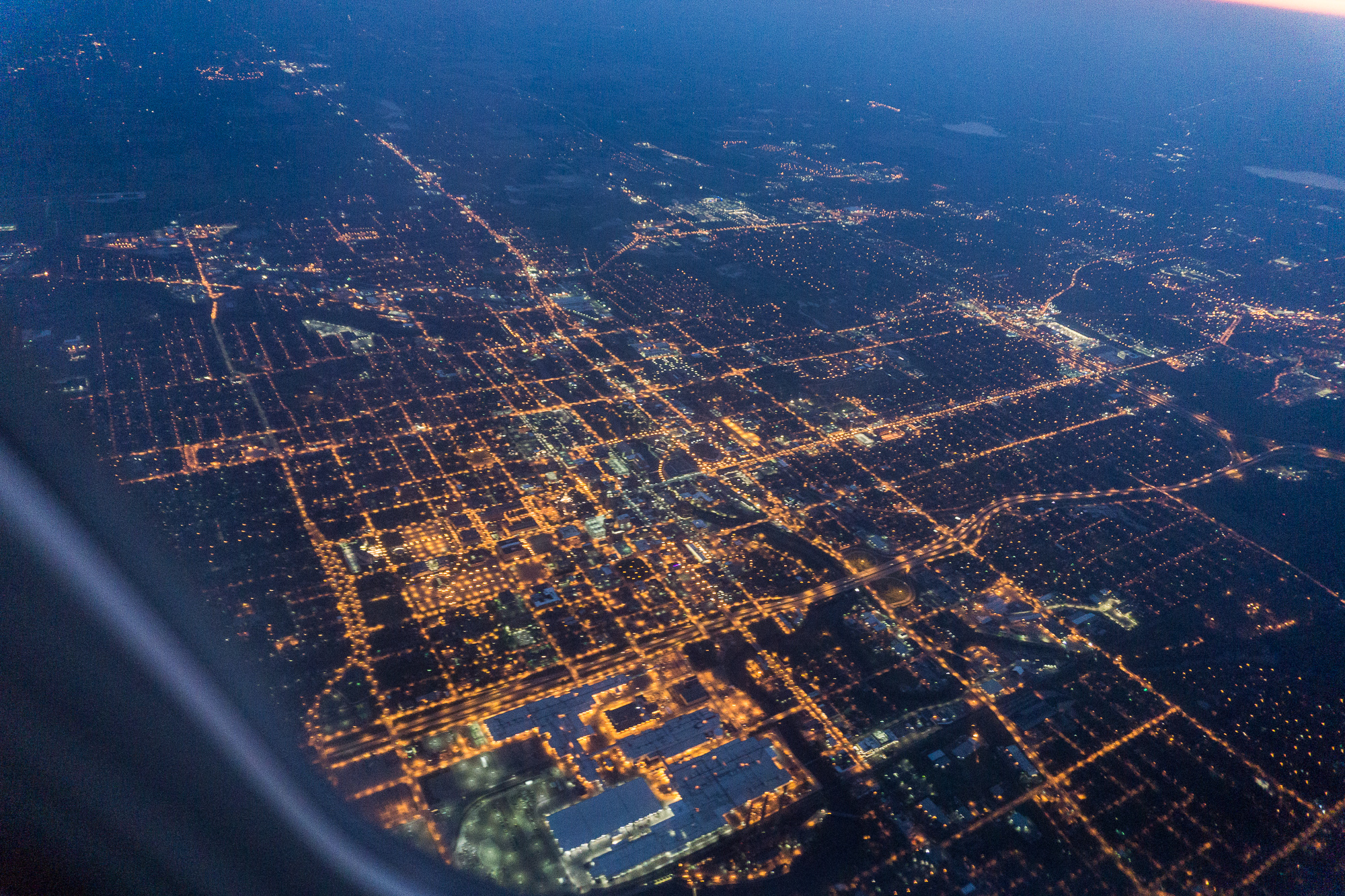
- Aerial image of Lansing

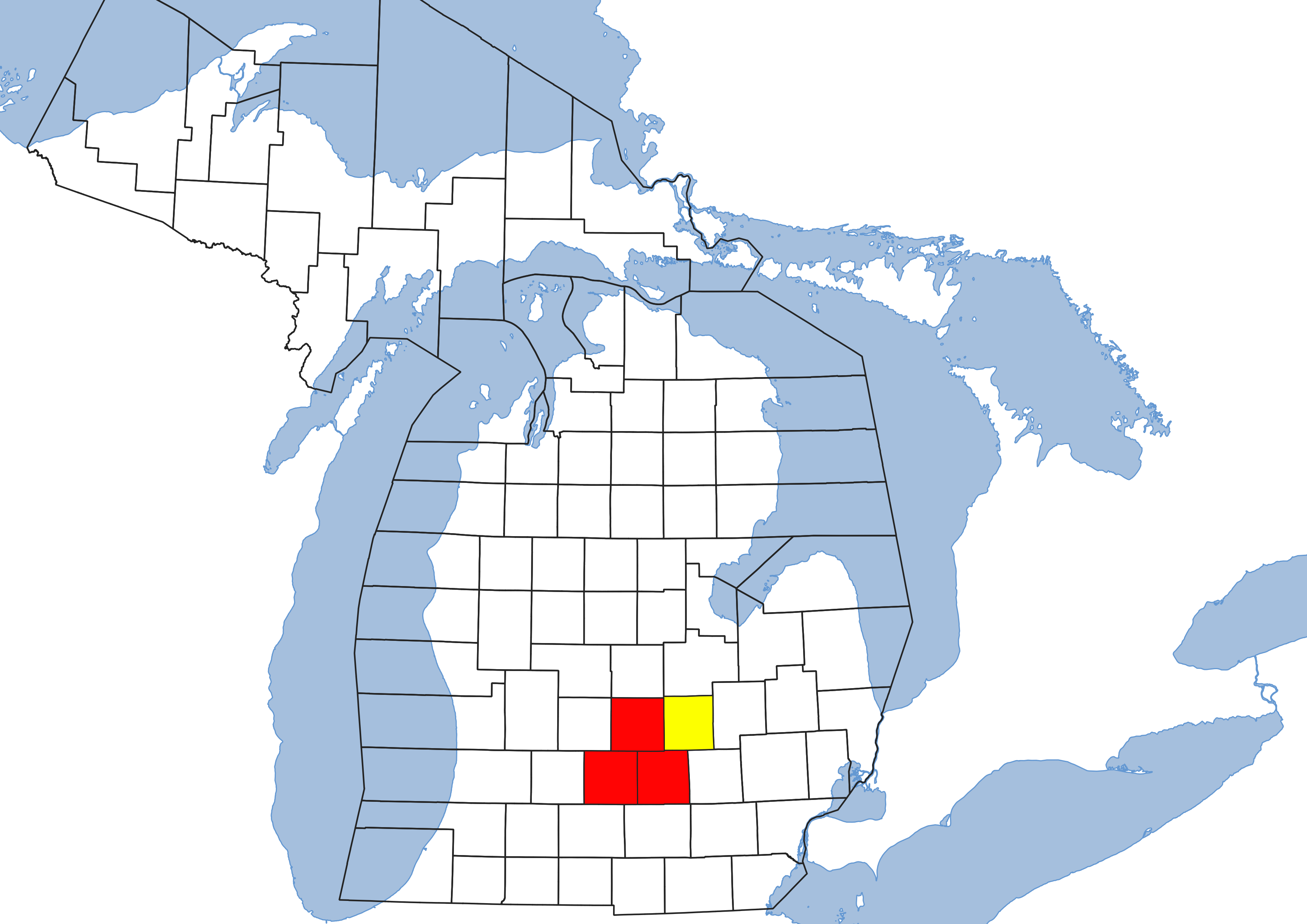
- Lansing–East Lansing MSA CSA: Lansing-East Lansing, MI MSA Owosso, MI μSA
- Country: United States
- State: Michigan
- Largest city: Lansing
- Counties: List: In MSA: Clinton; Eaton; Ingham

Area
  - Urban: 158.1 sq mi (409 km^{2})
  - MSA: 1,714.7 sq mi (4,441 km^{2})
- Highest elevation: 1,050 ft (320 m)
- Lowest elevation: 830 ft (250 m)

Population (2020)
  - Urban: 313,532
  - MSA: 473,203
  - CSA: 541,624

GDP
  - MSA: $32.633 billion (2022)
- Time zone: UTC-5 (EST)
  - Summer (DST): UTC-4 (EDT)
- Area codes: 517, 989

The Lansing–East Lansing Metropolitan Statistical Area is a metropolitan area located in Central Michigan defined by the Office of Management and Budget, and encompassing the counties of Eaton, Clinton, and Ingham. As of the 2020 census, the MSA had a population of 473,203. It ranks as Michigan's third-largest metropolitan area behind metropolitan Detroit and Grand Rapids.

== Description ==
The metropolitan area was originally defined as only including Ingham County in 1950, but Eaton and Clinton counties were added in 1960. Ionia County was added in 1973, but taken out a decade later for the 1990 Census. Shiawassee County was added in 2018 after commuting flows increased enough for it to qualify as an "outlying county" but was removed when core-based statistical areas (CBSAs) were re-delineated in 2023. It forms a combined statistical area (CSA) with Metro Lansing designated the Lansing-East Lansing-Owosso, MI CSA, which had a population of 541,624 at the 2020 census.

The Lansing Urban Area, as defined by the U.S. Census Bureau, which measures the extent of the built-up area, had a population of 313,532 as of the 2010 census.

== Counties ==
| County | Seat | 2025 estimate | 2020 Census | Change | Area | Density |
|---|---|---|---|---|---|---|
| Ingham | Mason | 289,709 | 284,900 | +1.69% | 561 sq mi (1,450 km^{2}) | 516/sq mi (199/km^{2}) |
| Eaton | Charlotte | 109,581 | 109,175 | +0.37% | 579 sq mi (1,500 km^{2}) | 189/sq mi (73/km^{2}) |
| Clinton | St. Johns | 80,432 | 79,128 | +1.65% | 574 sq mi (1,490 km^{2}) | 140/sq mi (54/km^{2}) |
| Total | | 479,722 | 473,203 | +1.38% | 1,714 sq mi (4,440 km^{2}) | 280/sq mi (108/km^{2}) |

== Communities ==
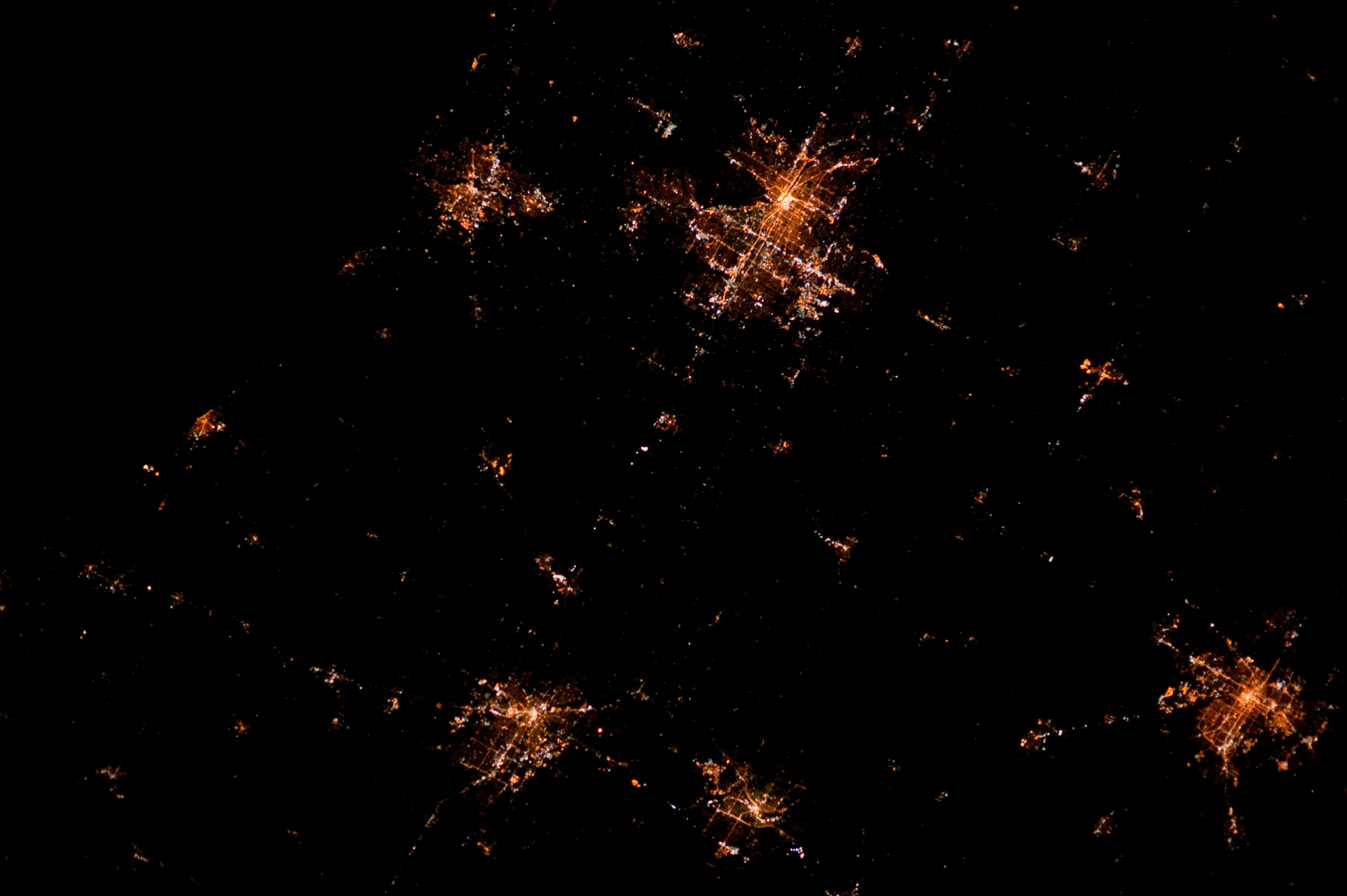
Lansing and nearby cities, taken from the ISS in 2012. Lansing is in the lower right hand corner. At top are Holland (left) and Grand Rapids (center). In the lower part of the photo to the left of Lansing are Kalamazoo (left) and Battle Creek (right).

=== Cities and Townships with more than 25,000 inhabitants ===
- Lansing (Principal City)
- East Lansing (Principal City)
- Meridian Charter Township
- Delta Charter Township
- Delhi Charter Township

=== Cities and Townships with 10,000 to 25,000 inhabitants ===
- DeWitt Charter Township
- Bath Charter Township

== Demographics ==
Historical population
| Census | Pop. | Note | %± |
|---|---|---|---|
| 1900 | 96,622 | | — |
| 1910 | 106,938 | | 10.7% |
| 1920 | 134,041 | | 25.3% |
| 1930 | 172,489 | | 28.7% |
| 1940 | 191,411 | | 11.0% |
| 1950 | 244,159 | | 27.6% |
| 1960 | 298,949 | | 22.4% |
| 1970 | 378,423 | | 26.6% |
| 1980 | 416,667 | | 10.1% |
| 1990 | 432,674 | | 3.8% |
| 2000 | 447,734 | | 3.5% |
| 2010 | 464,036 | | 3.6% |
| 2020 | 473,203 | | 2.0% |
| 2025 (est.) | 479,722 | | 1.4% |
Metropolitan Statistical Area (MSA)

=== 2020 ===
As of the census of 2020, there were 473,546 people residing within the MSA. The racial makeup of the MSA was 77.6% White, 8.3% African American, 0.4% Native American, 3.9% Asian, 0.00% Pacific Islander, 2.2% from other races, and 7.3% from two or more races. Hispanic or Latino of any race were 6.8% of the population.

=== 2010 ===
As of the census of 2010, there were 464,036 people, 183,442 households, and 112,131 families residing within the MSA. The racial makeup of the MSA was 81.6% White, 8.9% African American, 0.5% Native American, 3.8% Asian, 0.03% Pacific Islander, 1.9% from other races, and 3.3% from two or more races. Hispanic or Latino of any race were 3.9% of the population.

As of the 2010 American Community Survey estimates, the median income for a household in the MSA was $47,731, and the median income for a family was $60,602. The per capita income for the MSA was $23,359. The region's foreign-born population sat at 7.0%.

== See also ==
- Michigan census statistical areas
