= 1320 AM =

AM radio frequency

The following radio stations broadcast on AM frequency 1320 kHz: The U.S. Federal Communications Commission and the Canadian Radio-television and Telecommunications Commission classify 1320 kHz as a regional broadcast frequency.

== In Argentina ==
- Area 1 in Caseros
- LU10 in Azul, Buenos Aires
- LV24 Andina in Tunuyán, Mendoza

== In Canada ==
Call sign	City of license	Daytime power (kW)	Nighttime power (kW)	Transmitter coordinates
CHMB	Vancouver, British Columbia	50	50	49.164301°N 123.042701°W

== In Mexico ==
- XENM-AM in Aguascalientes, Aguascalientes
- XEARZ-AM in Mexico City
- XENET-AM in Mexico City

== In the United States ==
Call sign	City of license	Facility ID	Class	Daytime power (kW)	Nighttime power (kW)	Unlimited power (kW)	Transmitter coordinates
KCLI	Clinton, Oklahoma	14763	D	1	0.108		35.483333°N 98.981667°W
KELO	Sioux Falls, South Dakota	41981	B	5	5		43.488056°N 96.637222°W
KGDC	Walla Walla, Washington	35124	D	1	0.066		46.023611°N 118.354722°W
KIFM	West Sacramento, California	67848	B	5	0.62		38.636389°N 121.5525°W (daytime); 38.711667°N 121.328889°W (nighttime)
KKSM	Oceanside, California	51506	B			0.5	33.202222°N 117.338056°W
KLWN	Lawrence, Kansas	36744	B	0.5	0.25		38.934722°N 95.286667°W
KMAQ	Maquoketa, Iowa	39858	D	0.5	0.135		42.090556°N 90.628611°W
KNCB	Vivian, Louisiana	49154	D	5	0.057		32.902222°N 93.982778°W
KNIA	Knoxville, Iowa	39463	D	0.5	0.222		41.330556°N 93.109444°W
KNIT	Salt Lake City, Utah	53500	B	0.73	0.73		40.665833°N 111.907222°W
KOFA	Yuma, Arizona	2758	D	0.73	0.106		32.689444°N 114.5°W
KOZY	Grand Rapids, Minnesota	34971	B	5	5		47.172778°N 93.452778°W
KRLW	Walnut Ridge, Arkansas	70466	D	1	0.152		36.066111°N 90.94°W
KSIV	Clayton, Missouri	6499	B	4.6	0.27		38.607222°N 90.353889°W
KVMC	Colorado City, Texas	30102	D	1			32.3875°N 100.8925°W
KWHN	Fort Smith, Arkansas	22099	B	5	5		35.416944°N 94.365°W
KWQQ	Hemet, California	36830	B	0.5	0.3		33.749722°N 116.998056°W
KXRO	Aberdeen, Washington	52674	B	5	1		46.9575°N 123.809444°W
KXYZ	Houston, Texas	95	B	8.4	2.8		29.710833°N 95.175°W
WAGY	Forest City, North Carolina	70700	D	1	0.03		35.354444°N 81.879444°W
WARA	Attleboro, Massachusetts	65197	B	5	5		41.959167°N 71.326944°W
WATR	Waterbury, Connecticut	71102	B	5	1		41.536667°N 73.031111°W
WBRT	Bardstown, Kentucky	48244	D	1	0.044		37.819167°N 85.486111°W
WBTL	Ashland, Virginia	52050	D	1	0.008		37.466667°N 77.452222°W
WCOG	Greensboro, North Carolina	74203	B	5	5		36.150278°N 79.913333°W
WCVG	Covington, Kentucky	56220	B	0.5	0.43		39.045556°N 84.508333°W
WCVR	Randolph, Vermont	63472	D	1	0.066		43.9375°N 72.636389°W
WDER	Derry, New Hampshire	61615	B	10	0.6		42.866389°N 71.287222°W
WDIZ	Venice, Florida	3060	B	5	0.142		27.105°N 82.399722°W
WDMJ	Marquette, Michigan	24448	D	5	0.14		46.545278°N 87.444444°W
WDSA	Dothan, Alabama	30278	D	1	0.092		31.248333°N 85.388889°W
WENN	Birmingham, Alabama	6411	D	5	0.111		33.561389°N 86.860278°W
WFHR	Wisconsin Rapids, Wisconsin	73053	B	5	0.09		44.415556°N 89.835°W
WGET	Gettysburg, Pennsylvania	67132	B	1	0.5		39.841667°N 77.223611°W
WILS	Lansing, Michigan	39537	B	25	1.9		42.621944°N 84.643889°W
WISW	Columbia, South Carolina	54793	B	5	2.5		34.004444°N 81.070833°W
WJAS	Pittsburgh, Pennsylvania	55705	B	7	3.3		40.479444°N 79.903333°W
WJKI	Salisbury, Maryland	53485	D	1	0.028		38.360833°N 75.616667°W
WJNJ	Jacksonville, Florida	29736	B	16	0.08		30.295°N 81.7425°W
WKAN	Kankakee, Illinois	62359	B	1	0.5		41.135556°N 87.819444°W
WKRK	Murphy, North Carolina	10829	D	5	0.062		35.111667°N 84.008611°W
WLOH	Lancaster, Ohio	73217	D	0.5	0.016		39.703611°N 82.553611°W
WLQY	Hollywood, Florida	23609	B	5	5		26.031389°N 80.278333°W
WMSR	Manchester, Tennessee	12205	D	5	0.079		35.4675°N 86.095°W
WNGO	Mayfield, Kentucky	71614	D	1	0.097		36.760278°N 88.638889°W
WOBL	Oberlin, Ohio	73364	B	1	1		41.268056°N 82.211111°W
WRJW	Picayune, Mississippi	52043	D	5	0.075		30.518333°N 89.644722°W
WSKN	San Juan, Puerto Rico	10062	B	5	2.3		18.383333°N 66.066944°W
WTKZ	Allentown, Pennsylvania	27510	B	0.75	0.195		40.5925°N 75.478333°W
WVGM	Lynchburg, Virginia	70330	D	1	0.024		37.426944°N 79.123889°W
