= MacDonald Broadcasting =

American radio broadcasting company

- Type: Limited liability company
- Industry: Radio broadcasting
- Founded: 1962
- Headquarters: Saginaw, Michigan
- Key people: Kenneth MacDonald, Sr.
- Services: Radio, digital media
- Owner: Kenneth MacDonald, Jr.
- Website: https://macdonaldgarberbroadcasting.com/

MacDonald Broadcasting is a privately held radio broadcasting company in Michigan owned by Kenneth MacDonald, Jr. The family-owned broadcasting group is headquartered in Saginaw and owns eight radio stations across Mid-Michigan, including stations in the Tri-Cities and Lansing markets.

Under the name MacDonald Audio Communications, Kenneth MacDonald also owns a MUZAK service delivering commercial-free music to retail stores across the region.

The company previously owned stations in the Petoskey and Cadillac radio markets; however, those stations were spun off to MacDonald-Garber Broadcasting. Prior to the split of the company, MacDonald Broadcasting was the largest privately held and family-owned broadcaster in the state.

== History ==
MacDonald Broadcasting began in 1962 when Kenneth MacDonald (Sr.) moved from Ann Arbor to Saginaw and purchased WSAM from the estate of the late Fred Knorr. The station broadcasts on AM 1400, it was originally located at Weiss and Bay Streets on Saginaw's west side but had since moved to Whittier Street on Saginaw's east side, where it remains to this day. The station's over-300-foot-tall self-supporting tower is a local eastside Saginaw landmark, and was originally constructed for both the radio station and television station WNEM. The TV station later abandoned its plans to broadcast from the MacDonald tower and moved to Indiantown. For much of the 1960s and 70s, WSAM had a top 40 CHR format at the time. "Sam" saw local competition from 1250 WKNX until the format gave way to FM radio. In 1968, "Sam" got a sister station at FM 98.1. It was originally known as WSAM-FM and its call letters were changed to WKCQ, and has had a country music format since its inception.

Kenneth H. MacDonald Sr. would go on to buy stations in the Petoskey and Cadillac markets in the 1970s. He befriended WMBN founder Les Biederman, who needed to divest himself of his Petoskey properties in order to increase the power of WTCM in Traverse City. MacDonald, who vacationed in Petoskey and was familiar with the stations, purchased 1340 WMBN and 96.3 WMBN-FM (WLXT) from Biederman. MacDonald also picked up Biederman's Cadillac stations, 1240 WATT and 96.7 WLXV. Later, in 1994, MacDonald bought Charlevoix's 1270 WMKT and 105.9 WKHQ form Midwest Family Broadcasting.

MacDonald expanded to the Lansing-East Lansing market in 1989 with the purchase of 1320 WILS and 101.7 WILS-FM. WILS-AM at the time had an Urban Contemporary format, later flipping to country, Adult Standards and finally News/Talk. MacDonald changed the format for WILS-FM from mainstream Adult Contemporary to Hot AC as WKKP, back to mainstream AC as WLYY, country music reclaiming the WILS-FM calls, Contemporary Hit Radio as WHZZ and finally to Variety Hits keeping the WHZZ calls rebranding as "Mike FM"".

The Northern Michigan stations of MacDonald were eventually spun off into a separate company called MacDonald-Garber Broadcasting in 1998, headed up by Kenneth MacDonald's daughter Patricia MacDonald. The group would later acquire WKAD, WZTC, and a cluster of stations in Colorado.

Back in Saginaw, FM stations 104.1 WSAG and 97.3 WMJO were added to the MacDonald Broadcasting portfolio. WMJO of Essexville was purchased by MacDonald in 1998 from local owner-operator Geary Morrill and flipped its format form country to classic rock, and most recently to a variety hits format branded as Joe FM. WSAG was bought by MacDonald in 2005 and its City of License was changed from Pinconning to Linwood so the city of license would be within thirty miles of the main studios in Saginaw. WSAG simulcasts WSAM 1400's current soft adult contemporary format known as The Bay.

Most recently in Lansing, MacDonald acquired 1180 WXLA and 96.5 WQHH in 2006. WXLA, licensed to Dimondale, was broadcasting a contemporary R&B format at the time became a satellite-fed adult standards station following WILS's switch to talk radio. WQHH of DeWitt continued to keep its hip hop and urban contemporary format. In 2008, 1320 WILS launched its new 25,000-watt transmitter, making MacDonald the owner of Mid-Michigan's most powerful AM radio station.

Both Kenneth MacDonald Senior and Junior have been inducted into the Michigan Association of Broadcasters Hall of Fame.

MacDonald Senior died in 1989, leaving the family business to his son Kenneth (Mac) MacDonald, Jr. and daughter Patricia (Trish) MacDonald-Garber. Archives from the MacDoanlds' broadcasting career, known as the Kenneth MacDonald Papers, have been donated to the Bentley Historical Library at the University of Michigan.

== Radio stations ==
=== Tri-Cities ===
- WSAM AM 1400, Saginaw, Michigan, Soft Adult Contemporary
- WSAG FM 104.1, Linwood, Michigan, Soft Adult Contemporary
- WKCQ, FM 98.1, Saginaw, Michigan, Country
- WMJO, FM 97.3, Essexville, Michigan, Variety Hits

=== Lansing-East Lansing ===
- WILS AM 1320, Lansing, Michigan, News/Talk
- WXLA AM 1180, Dimondale, Michigan, Soft Adult Contemporary
- WHZZ, FM 101.7, Lansing, Michigan, Variety Hits
- WQHH, FM 96.5, Dewitt, Michigan, Urban/Hip-Hop
