= WSMH =

Television station in Flint, Michigan

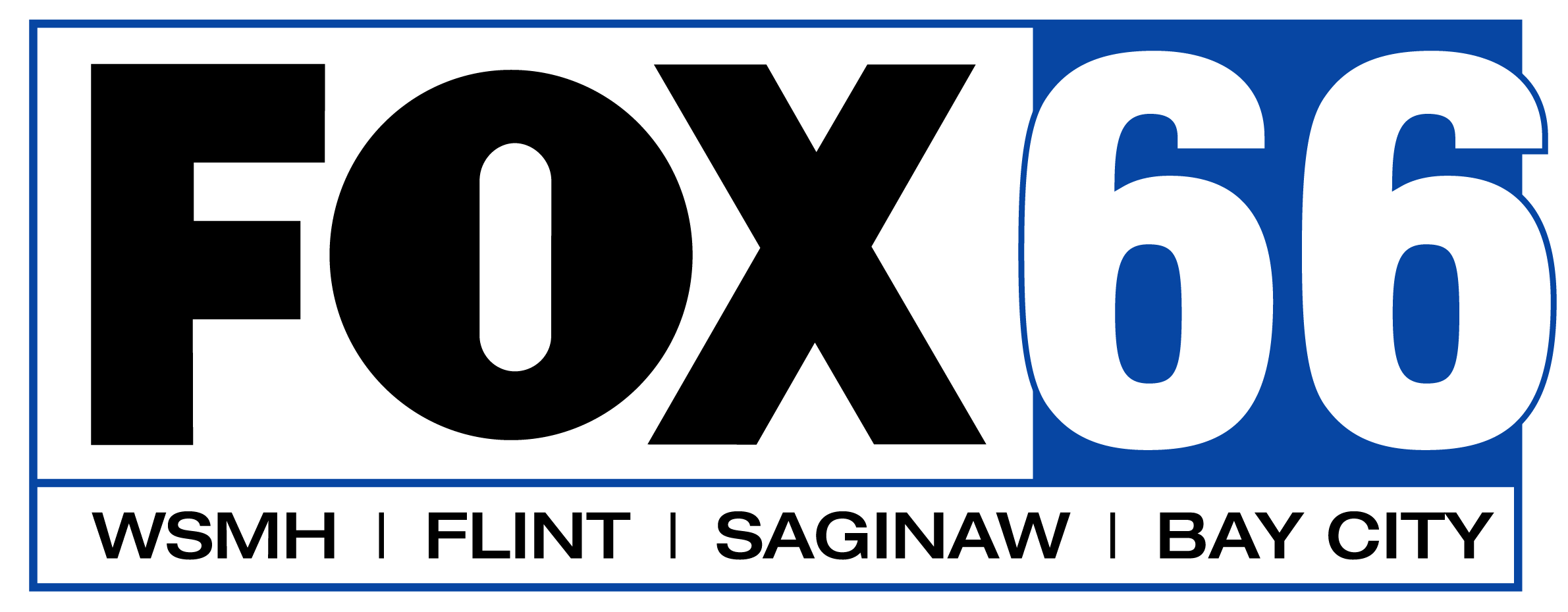

- Flint–Saginaw–Bay City–Midland, Michigan; United States
- City: Flint, Michigan
- Channels: Digital: 16 (UHF); Virtual: 66
- Branding: Fox66 (66.1); NBC 25 (66.2); Mid-Michigan Now

Programming
- Affiliations: 66.1: Fox; 66.2: NBC; for others, see § Subchannels

Ownership
- Owner: Sinclair Broadcast Group; (WSMH Licensee, LLC)
- Sister stations: WEYI-TV; WBSF

History
- First air date: January 13, 1985
- Former channel numbers: Analog: 66 (UHF, 1985–2009)
- Former affiliations: Independent (1985–1986)
- Call sign meaning: First names of the children of founding partner Harley G. Hunter

Technical information
- Licensing authority: FCC
- Facility ID: 21737
- ERP: 245 kW
- HAAT: 365.5 m (1,199 ft)
- Transmitter coordinates: 43°13′31″N 84°4′33″W

Links
- Public license information: Public file; LMS
- Website: midmichigannow.com

WSMH (channel 66) is a television station licensed to Flint, Michigan, United States, serving east central Michigan as an affiliate of Fox and NBC. It is owned by Sinclair Broadcast Group alongside WEYI-TV (channel 25) and CW affiliate WBSF (channel 46). The three stations share studios on West Pierson Road in Mount Morris Township; WSMH's transmitter is located on Amman Road northeast of Chesaning.

WSMH went on the air on January 13, 1985, as an independent station. Its first months on air were marked by a dispute over tower construction and a fire that kept the fledgling station off the air for more than a month. WSMH was sold in 1986 to Cincinnati businessman Gerald J. Robinson and affiliated with the new Fox network that year. Sinclair acquired it in 1996. In 2002, the station debuted its first local newscast, which was also the first to use Sinclair's partially centralized News Central format in which national segments and weather originated from a facility in Maryland. When News Central was wound down in 2006, WSMH instead began airing a 10 p.m. newscast from local CBS affiliate WNEM-TV.

Sinclair acquired Barrington Broadcasting in 2013 and assumed operational control, but not the licenses, of WEYI and WBSF. WEYI's newsroom assumed production responsibility for the 10 p.m. newscast two years later. On December 10, 2025, the NBC subchannel of WEYI moved to WSMH.

== History ==
=== Early years ===
In January 1983, Flint Family Television, a group of partners from the Denver area, filed to build a television station on Flint's unused channel 66. The three other applications for the channel that followed included bids by F&S Comm/News, the owners of WFSL in Lansing; a group based in Grand Rapids; and a Knoxville, Tennessee, attorney. The latter two applicants withdrew, not wanting to go through the time and expense of a comparative hearing, and F&S Comm/News settled with Flint Family Television and withdrew its application in November.

Construction of channel 66 began in late 1984. It set up its studio facility in a building that housed a roller rink in a shopping center on Ballenger Highway in Flint. The tower, at Chesaning, was a joint venture with another station going on the air at the same time, the Christian-oriented WAQP (channel 49). However, it was not complete when WSMH began airing its first program tests on January 13, 1985, due to bad weather and a recent ice storm. As a result, channel 66's first transmissions were at 3 percent of the authorized power level. It was the area's first commercial television station since WJRT began in 1958, a general-entertainment independent station with a lineup of movies, syndicated shows, and cartoons.

The tower construction problems grew into a full-fledged dispute with WAQP after WSMH made its first broadcast. WSMH sued WAQP owner Tri-State Christian TV, claiming that the latter's employees were preventing completion of the tower. WSMH alleged that an employee of Tri-State had claimed to a tower rigger that, were anyone to try to complete the tower, he would cut the wires supporting workers above the 700-foot (210 m) level. WSMH left the air on February 12 after a fire damaged the transmitter power supply. Eventually, WSMH acquiesced to Tri-State Christian TV's demands, settled the dispute, and remained off the air while the facility was completed. On April 8, WSMH returned to the air at its full power.

Despite going on the air, the late start caused the station to miss two months of advertising revenue. In June, the station named its second general manager, and program distributor Viacom pulled its programming from WSMH over a contract dispute. By August, there were rumors the station was to be sold, and in April 1986, the Federal Communications Commission (FCC) approved the sale of WSMH to Gerald J. Robinson, a Cincinnati businessman who owned WYZZ-TV in Bloomington, Illinois. The former owners went on to sue Media Management Company, a Chicago-based firm that had provided management services to channel 66 at its start, for breach of contract that it claimed caused undue losses. WSMH affiliated with Fox at the network's launch in October 1986.

=== Sinclair acquisition and News Central ===
Having made channel 66 a competitor in the Flint television market, Robinson's Kenko Corp. sold WYZZ and WSMH to Sinclair Broadcast Group in a $34 million transaction in 1996. Six years later, Sinclair used WSMH as the test bed for a new newscast concept. On October 29, 2002, WSMH began producing a nightly 10 p.m. newscast. It was the first newscast to use the News Central format. Weeknight anchor Jim Kiertzner moved over from WNEM-TV and presented local news emphasizing Saginaw County from WSMH, while national news, weather, and sports aired from News Central headquarters in Hunt Valley, Maryland (a suburb of Baltimore). The format was tailored to adults aged 18–49.

News Central was not a general success, and in 2006 Sinclair wound down the national operation. On April 24, 2006, WNEM-TV began producing an hour-long 10 p.m. newscast for WSMH with its facilities and personnel.

=== Mid-Michigan expansion ===
Sinclair Broadcast Group acquired Barrington Broadcasting, owner of Mid-Michigan NBC affiliate WEYI-TV (channel 25). Under then-existing FCC rules, Sinclair could not own more than one license in the market. As part of the sale, Sinclair transferred the license assets of WEYI to Howard Stirk Holdings (owned by political commentator Armstrong Williams) and of WEYI's sister station, WBSF (channel 46), to Cunningham Broadcasting. WSMH took over the operations of both WEYI and WBSF through local marketing agreements when the deal was completed on November 25, 2013.

With WEYI-TV now co-owned, Sinclair discontinued the news share agreement with WNEM-TV and transferred production duties for the Fox66 News at 10 to the WEYI newsroom. The move led to the addition of 18 new news staffers. Sinclair announced numerous layoffs at WEYI–WSMH in March 2023, which led to a major cut in news production from the stations. The morning, 5 p.m., and weekend evening newscasts were discontinued, leaving the station to broadcast newscasts at 6 and 11 p.m.

On December 10, 2025, the NBC affiliation was moved from WEYI-TV to WSMH's second subchannel, while WEYI-TV's main channel flipped to Roar.

== Technical information ==
=== Subchannels ===
WSMH's transmitter is located on Amman Road northeast of Chesaning. The station's signal is multiplexed:

Subchannels of WSMH
Subchannel	Res.	Short name	Programming
66.1	720p	FOX66	Fox
66.2	1080i	NBC	NBC
66.3	480i	Comet	Comet
46.3	480i	Antenna	Antenna TV (WBSF)

Broadcast on behalf of another station

=== Analog-to-digital conversion ===
WSMH ended regular programming on its analog signal, over UHF channel 66, on May 21, 2009. The station's digital signal remained on its pre-transition UHF channel 16, using virtual channel 66.

== See also ==
- Channel 16 digital TV stations in the United States
- Channel 66 virtual TV stations in the United States
