= WNEM =

WNEM may refer to:

- WNEM-TV, a CBS-affiliated television station (channel 30, virtual 5) serving the Flint/Saginaw/Bay City/Midland, Michigan area.
- WJMK (AM), a MeTV Music-affiliated radio station (1250 AM) licensed to serve the Saginaw/Bay City, Michigan market, which held the call sign WNEM from 2004 to 2013
