= WBSF =

Television station in Bay City, Michigan

ATSC 3.0 station
- Bay City–Saginaw–Flint–Midland, Michigan; United States
- City: Bay City, Michigan
- Channels: Digital: 23 (UHF); Virtual: 46
- Branding: CW 46

Programming
- Affiliations: 46.1: The CW; for others, see § Subchannels

Ownership
- Owner: Sinclair Broadcast Group; (WSMH Licensee, LLC)
- Sister stations: WEYI-TV; WSMH

History
- Founded: 2004 as a digital subchannel
- First air date: September 18, 2006
- Former channel numbers: Analog: 46 (UHF, 2006–2009); Digital: 46 (UHF, 2008–2019)
- Former affiliations: The WB (2004–2006)
- Call sign meaning: WB Saginaw-Flint or Bay City-Saginaw-Flint

Technical information
- Licensing authority: FCC
- Facility ID: 82627
- ERP: 600 kW
- HAAT: 365 m (1,198 ft)
- Transmitter coordinates: 43°13′1″N 83°43′17″W

Links
- Public license information: Public file; LMS
- Website: thecw46.com

WBSF (channel 46) is a television station licensed to Bay City, Michigan, United States, serving east central Michigan as an affiliate of The CW. It is owned by Sinclair Broadcast Group alongside WEYI-TV (channel 25) and dual Fox/NBC affiliate WSMH (channel 66).

The three stations share studios on West Pierson Road in Mount Morris Township (with a Flint mailing address); WBSF's transmitter is located at its former studios on West Willard Road in Vienna Township along the Genesee–Saginaw county line (with a Clio mailing address).

== History ==
A permit was issued by the FCC for a new station on channel 46 in Bay City to Vista Communications Group in late 2003. The station was expected to be the WB network affiliate for the Flint/Tri-Cities market.

On October 1, 2004, the station's construction permit was approved. In that same year, Barrington Broadcasting launched WBSF on cable and on WEYI's second digital subchannel, bringing The WB back to the market after a three-year absence (WB programming in-market was last seen on WEYI on a secondary clearance from 1999 to 2001). On February 2, 2005, the FCC transferred the permit to Acme Television then to Barrington.

With the merger of The WB and UPN to become The CW, WBSF became the area's network affiliate in September 2006 when the channel began broadcasting over the air. As a result of the network change, WBSF rebranded from "Mid-Michigan's WB" to "CW 46 Mid-Michigan". However, its call letters were not changed as the "B" in the calls also stands for Bay City which is the station's city of license. "S" and "F" stand for Saginaw and Flint, respectively. WBSF signed-on its analog channel on September 13, 2006, although it continued to be seen on WEYI-DT2. It was the only full-power television station to be built and signed-on by Barrington Broadcasting.

On February 28, 2013, Barrington announced that it would sell its entire group, including WBSF and WEYI, to Sinclair Broadcast Group. However, due to FCC duopoly regulations, since Sinclair already owns Fox affiliate WSMH, Sinclair transferred the license assets of WBSF to Cunningham Broadcasting and of WEYI to Howard Stirk Holdings (owned by conservative talk show host Armstrong Williams). WSMH took over the operations of both WBSF and WEYI through local marketing agreements when the deal was completed on November 25.

== Programming ==
WBSF has served as an alternate NBC affiliate. In 2006, the channel aired an episode of Friday Night Lights on tape delay due to WEYI's broadcast of the second Michigan gubernatorial debate. The station may air any preempted NBC program should the preemption occur on WSMH-DT2 for a local special, breaking news story, any other emergency, or Detroit Lions preseason football.

=== Newscasts ===
WBSF once aired a weeknight newscast called The 7 O'Clock News on CW 46 which was produced by WEYI. This production was canceled in April 2008.

== Technical information ==
=== Subchannels ===
The station's ATSC 1.0 channels are carried on the multiplexed signals of sister stations WEYI and WSMH:

Subchannels provided by WBSF (ATSC 1.0)
Subchannel	Res.	Short name	Programming	ATSC 1.0 host
46.1	1080i	CW	The CW	WEYI-TV
46.2	480i	Charge!	Charge!	WEYI-TV
46.3	480i	Antenna	Antenna TV	WSMH

=== Analog-to-digital conversion ===
In June 2008, WBSF received its construction permit for its digital facilities with the station switching from analog to digital broadcasting on June 12, 2009.

=== ATSC 3.0 conversion ===
The station began broadcasting in ATSC 3.0 on March 15, 2022, carrying the signal of that station along with WJRT-TV, WNEM, WSMH, and WEYI-TV.

Subchannels of WBSF (ATSC 3.0)
Subchannel	Res.	Short name	Programming
5.1	1080p	WNEMDT	CBS (WNEM-TV)
12.1	720p	WJRT	ABC (WJRT-TV)
25.1	1080p	WEYI	Roar (WEYI-TV)
46.1	1080p	WBSF	The CW
66.1	720p	WSMH	Fox (WSMH)
66.2	1080p	WSMHNBC	NBC (WSMH)
66.10	1080p	T2	T2
66.11	1080p	PBTV	Pickleballtv
66.20		GMLOOP	GameLoop
66.21		ROXi	ROXi

Subchannel broadcast with digital rights management
Subchannel streamed via the Internet
