= Armstrong Williams =

American political writer (born 1959)

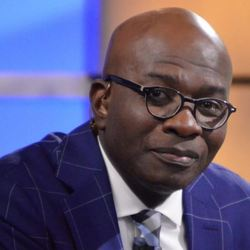
- Born: February 5, 1959 (age 67); Marion, South Carolina, US
- Education: South Carolina State University, (BA)
- Occupations: TV host, nationally syndicated columnist, political activist, and entrepreneur
- Political party: Republican
- Website: www.armstrongwilliams.com

Armstrong Williams (born February 5, 1959) is an American conservative political commentator, entrepreneur, author, and talk show host. Williams writes a nationally syndicated conservative newspaper column, has hosted a daily radio show, and hosts a nationally syndicated television program called The Armstrong Williams Show. He is the owner of Howard Stirk Holdings, a media company affiliated with Sinclair Broadcasting that has purchased numerous television stations.

== Early life, family and education ==
Armstrong Williams was born on February 5, 1959 in Marion, South Carolina to Thelma Howard Williams and James Stirk Williams. Williams, one of 10 children, was reared on the family's 200-acre (81 ha) tobacco farm.

(Williams is a cousin of South Carolina State Senator Clementa Pinckney, who was a victim of the Charleston church shooting.)

Williams was known during high school to have a talent for public speaking. He earned a BA in Political Science and English at South Carolina State University, graduating in 1981. He is a life member of Phi Beta Sigma fraternity.

== Career ==
After college, Williams worked in Washington DC as a presidential appointee at the U.S. Department of Agriculture, assisting rural farmers. Williams served as a confidential assistant to the chairman of the US Equal Employment Opportunity Commission (and future Supreme Court Justice) Clarence Thomas. Williams was a legislative aide and advisor to US Senator for South Carolina, Strom Thurmond.

Later, he worked as vice-president for governmental and international affairs at B&C Associates, followed by being part of the formation of the international marketing, advertising, and media public relations consulting firm Graham Williams Group in 1991. He is its CEO.

=== Radio ===
Williams' first radio show began in 1991. In 1998, he united with The Salem Radio Network, which syndicated his national radio show to 26 of the top radio markets in the country. In 2002, he reunited with the Newark, New Jersey-based Talk America Radio Network. Williams joined the lineup at WWRL 1600 AM in March 2005 as co-host with Sam Greenfield on Drive Time Dialogue.

Williams began hosting The Armstrong Williams Show, a nightly talk show in 2008 on XM Satellite Radio Power 128 (now SiriusXM Urban View).

=== Television ===
Williams was a political analyst for Sinclair Broadcasting Group's TV program News Central.

Williams has hosted numerous TV shows. His show The Right Side with Armstrong Williams began in 1995. From 2002 to 2005, he hosted On Point with Armstrong Williams on cable network TV One. He hosts a syndicated television show, The Armstrong Williams Show. He hosted The Right Side Forum.

=== Newspaper column ===
Williams has written a syndicated newspaper column.

=== Howard Stirk Holdings ===
Howard Stirk Holdings, LLC
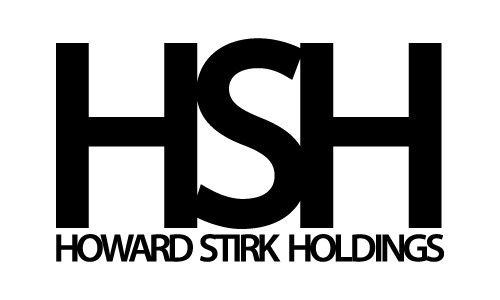
- Type: Private
- Industry: Broadcast media
- Founded: April 11, 2013; 13 years ago
- Founder: Armstrong Williams
- Headquarters: Washington DC, US
- Owner: Armstrong Williams
- Parent: Sinclair Broadcast Group
- Website: www.howardstirkholdings.com

Williams founded Howard Stirk Holdings in early 2013, with its name taken from his mother's maiden name, Howard, and his father's middle name, Stirk.

On February 28, 2013, Barrington Broadcasting announced that it would sell its entire group, including NBC affiliate WEYI-TV, Saginaw, Michigan and CW affiliate WBSF, Bay City, Michigan, to Sinclair Broadcast Group. Sinclair already owned a station in the market, Fox affiliate WSMH, Flint, Michigan, and could not own more than one license in the market. As part of the sale, Sinclair transferred the license assets of WEYI-TV to Howard Stirk Holdings and of WBSF to Cunningham Broadcasting. WSMH took over the operations of both WEYI-TV and WBSF through local marketing agreements (LMAs) when the deal was completed on November 25, 2013.

Included in the same February 2013 sale of Barrington Broadcasting's group to Sinclair Broadcast Group was ABC affiliate WPDE-TV, Florence, South Carolina; SagamoreHill Broadcasting owned Florence-licensed then-CW affiliate WWMB, which was operated by WPDE-TV under an LMA. Since the LMA was included in the group deal, SagamoreHill Broadcasting would sell the license assets of WWMB to Howard Stirk Holdings, with WPDE-TV continuing to operate WWMB. The sale was finalized on November 22.

On December 4, 2014, the FCC approved the transfer of station licenses for then-ZUUS Country affiliate WMMP (now MeTV affiliate WGWG), Charleston, South Carolina, WCFT-TV (now WSES), Tuscaloosa, Alabama, and WJSU-TV (now WGWW), Anniston, Alabama, from Sinclair to Howard Stirk Holdings. Under the arrangement, HSH would operate their future acquisitions as an independent broadcaster, forgoing agreements with third parties. On January 28, 2015, Intermountain West Communications Company filed to sell then-MyNetworkTV affiliate KVMY (now MeTV affiliate KHSV), Las Vegas, to Howard Stirk Holdings. The transaction was finalized on October 30. Howard Stirk Holdings revealed in its January 2015 application to purchase KHSV that it planned to acquire the license of then-CW affiliate WLYH-TV (now WXBU), Lancaster, Pennsylvania from Nexstar Broadcasting Group; that sale was completed on November 12, 2015. These transactions made Williams the largest African-American owner of television stations in the US at the time. In 2019, Byron Allen surpassed Williams with his purchase of most of the assets of Heartland Media.

On April 24, 2018, Sinclair announced that as part of its merger with Tribune Media, Howard Stirk Holdings would acquire the Sinclair-owned KUNS-TV in Seattle and KMYU in St. George, Utah, as well as the Tribune-owned KAUT-TV in Oklahoma City. This transaction was canceled once the Tribune deal collapsed in August 2018.

On August 12, 2025, Sinclair announced that it would acquire WWMB (at this time a Roar affiliate) outright, creating a legal duopoly with WPDE-TV. The sale was completed on December 1.

On August 12, 2025, Sinclair announced that it would acquire WXBU (at this time a Univision affiliate) outright, creating a legal duopoly with WHP-TV. The sale was completed on June 1, 2026.

In September 2025, Sinclair moved to buy WEYI-TV outright. On December 10, 2025, WEYI-TV's NBC affiliation was moved to WSMH's second subchannel, while WEYI-TV's main channel flipped to Roar. The sale was completed on March 1, 2026.

Stations owned by Howard Stirk Holdings

City of license / market	Station	Channel; TV (RF)	Owned; since	Primary network affiliation
Anniston–Tuscaloosa–Birmingham, Alabama	WGWW ^{2}	40 (9)	2015	H&I
Anniston–Tuscaloosa–Birmingham, Alabama	WSES	33 (33)	2015	H&I
Las Vegas, Nevada	KHSV	21 (2)	2015	MeTV
Charleston, South Carolina	WGWG	4 (34)	2015	MeTV

Stations formerly owned by Howard Stirk Holdings

City of license / market	Station	Channel; TV (RF)	Purchased	Sold	Primary network affiliation
Saginaw–Flint, Michigan	WEYI-TV	25 (30)	2013 ^{1}	2026	Roar
Lebanon–Lancaster–York–Harrisburg, Pennsylvania	WXBU	15 (23)	2015	2026	Univision
Florence–Myrtle Beach, South Carolina	WWMB	21 (21)	2013 ^{1}	2025	Roar

- ^{1} Operated under an LMA by Sinclair Broadcast Group
- ^{2} Has a TBA with Sinclair Broadcast Group

=== 'No Child Left Behind' controversy ===
In January 2005, USA Today reported that documents obtained under the Freedom of Information Act (NCLB) revealed that Williams had been paid $240,000 to promote the controversial No Child Left Behind Act. USA Today reported that Williams was hired "to promote the law on his nationally syndicated television show and to urge other black journalists to do the same." As part of the agreement, Williams was required "to regularly comment on NCLB during the course of his broadcasts", and to interview Education Secretary Rod Paige for TV and radio spots that aired during the show in 2004. The contract with Williams was part of a $950,000 contract between the US Department of Education and the public relations company Ketchum Inc.

After the USA Today revelations, Tribune Media Services (TMS) terminated its syndication agreement with Williams. In a statement to Editor & Publisher (E&P), TMS stated: "[A]ccepting compensation in any form from an entity that serves as a subject of his weekly newspaper columns creates, at the very least, the appearance of a conflict of interest. Under these circumstances, readers may well ask themselves if the views expressed in his columns are his own, or whether they have been purchased by a third party." In response, Williams initially told E&P that he intended self-syndicate his column. E&P contacted 10 newspapers listed as clients on Williams's website to ask if they would continue to carry the column; the majority stated that they would not. Williams later told the Associated Press, "Even though I'm not a journalist—I'm a commentator—I feel I should be held to the media ethics standard. My judgment was not the best. I wouldn't do it again, and I learned from it."

On September 30, 2005, the Government Accountability Office released a report concluding that the Department of Education had acted illegally in making the payments because the government's role in the public relations effort was not disclosed.

=== Sexual harassment settlements ===
Williams has settled sexual harassment lawsuits, one in 1997 and another in 2017.

== Other civic, supervisory and charitable activities ==
Williams was a longtime associate of US Department of Housing and Urban Development Secretary Ben Carson and was an influential surrogate during Carson's 2016 presidential campaign. He was a member-at-large of the board of the Carson Scholars Fund, a 501(c)(3) non-profit charitable organization.

Other boards on which he has served include: Childhelp USA, the newspaper Washington Afro-American, Independence Federal Savings Bank, and Newsmax. Williams was listed as a director of Independence Federal Savings Bank. However it is no longer operational. It faced financial difficulties and was placed under regulatory oversight, and in 2009, the Office of Thrift Supervision issued a cease and desist order to the bank, citing various operational issues; Williams was among the signatures listed as a director at that time.

== Honors and awards ==
In 2004, Williams was appointed by US President George W. Bush to the President's Commission on White House Fellows, which chooses White House Fellows.

Williams received an honorary doctorate from his alma mater South Carolina State University in 2021.

== Books by Williams ==
- Williams, Armstrong. Beyond Blame: How We Can Succeed by Breaking the Dependency Barrier, Free Press, 1995. ISBN 0-02-935365-3
- Williams, Armstrong. Reawakening Virtues: Restoring What Makes America Great, New Chapter Publisher, 2011. ISBN 0-9827918-5-2
- Williams, Armstrong. What Black and White America Must Do Now: A Prescription to Move Beyond Race, Hot Books, 2020. ISBN 0-029-35365-3
- Carson, Benjamin; Crump, Benjamin; Williams, Armstrong. Crisis in the Classroom: Crisis in Education.
- Williams, Armstrong. Letters to a young victim: Hope and Healing in America's Inner Cities, Scribner Paper Fiction, 1996. ISBN 0-684-82466-3

== See also ==
- Bush administration payment of columnists
- Black conservatism in the United States
