= Channel 66 =

Channel 66 refers to several television stations:

== Canada ==
The following television stations operate on virtual channel 66 in Canada:

- CHNU-DT in Fraser Valley, British Columbia
- CKWS-DT-1 in Brighton, Ontario

== Mexico ==
The following television stations operate on virtual channel 66 in Mexico:

- XHILA-TDT in Mexicali, Baja California

== See also ==
- Channel 66 virtual TV stations in the United States.
