= WSAM =

- Saginaw, Michigan; United States
- Broadcast area: Greater Tri-Cities
- Frequency: 1400 kHz
- Branding: 1400 AM & 104 FM The Bay

Programming
- Format: Soft adult contemporary

Ownership
- Owner: MacDonald Broadcasting
- Sister stations: WKCQ, WMJO, WSAG

History
- First air date: June 1, 1940
- Former frequencies: 1200 kHz (1940–1942)
- Call sign meaning: Saginaw, Michigan

Technical information
- Licensing authority: FCC
- Facility ID: 65930
- Class: C
- Power: 1,000 watts
- Transmitter coordinates: 43°25′01.1″N 83°55′07.4″W
- Translator: 92.3 W222CQ (Saginaw)

Links
- Public license information: Public file; LMS
- Website: thebay104fm.com

WSAM (1400 AM) is a radio station licensed to Saginaw, Michigan and broadcasting at 1400 kHz with 1,000 watts of power. The station is simulcasted with FM sister station WSAG-FM at 104.1 MHz and are collectively known as The Bay, in reference to their close proximity to the Saginaw Bay.

== History ==
WSAM was one of the first broadcasters in the Tri-Cities, predated only by WBCM in Bay City (which signed on in 1925). The original licensee was the Saginaw Broadcasting Company, owned by Milton Greenebaum. A construction permit for WSAM was issued by the Federal Communications Commission in March 1940. The original frequency of WSAM was 1200kHz with 100 watts of power. In June 1940, a license to cover was granted, moving WSAM up the dial to 1230 kHz which allowed for extended hours of nighttime operation, provided that co-channel WMPC in Lapeer signed off for the night. WSAM's studio and transmitter were originally located at Bay Road and Weiss Street on Saginaw's West side. The tower has been removed but the building still stands as part of an auto service garage.

In 1942, WSAM moved to its current frequency of 1400kHz with 250 watts of power. In 1949, WSAM moved to its current transmitter site on Whittier Street on Saginaw's East Side. The station's over 300 foot tall self-supporting tower is a local eastside Saginaw landmark, and was originally constructed for both the radio station and television station WNEM. The TV station later abandoned their plans to broadcast from the MacDonald tower and moved to Indiantown. WSAM was one of the first to invest in Frequency Modulation as it added an FM antenna to its AM tower that same year. In 1955, WSAM was bought by Michigan broadcasting mogul Fred Knorr, who was program director at WHLS in Port Huron before buying WKMH in Detroit. Knorr would later own the Detroit Tigers with partner John Fetzer. Following Knorr's death, the Saginaw Broadcasting Company was sold to Kenneth H. MacDonald of Ann Arbor in 1962.

For much of the '60s and '70s, WSAM had a top 40 CHR format at the time. "Sam" saw local competition from 1210 WKNX up until the format gave way to FM radio. In 1968, "Sam" got a sister station at FM 98.1. It was originally known as WSAM-FM and its call letters were changed to WKCQ, and has had a country music format since its inception.

In the 1980s, the station switched to an oldies format. Serendipitously, during WSAM's period as an oldies station, the long-held call letters lent themselves to the tagline "Play it Again, Sam". WSAM eventually becoming an adult standards station in the 90s and early 2000s.

The current format began in April 2005 with the purchase of WSAG at 104.1FM. The two stations are almost completely simulcasted and automated, except for some popular weekend polka shows on WSAM which are a holdover from the now-defunct adult standards format. Like most other adult contemporary music stations, The Bay switches to a format of continuous Christmas music during the months of November and December, competing with crosstown WHNN for the holiday music audience.

== Sources ==
- Michiguide.com - WSAG History
- Michiguide.com - WSAM History
