= WEYI-TV =

Television station in Saginaw, Michigan

- Saginaw–Flint–Bay City–Midland, Michigan; United States
- City: Saginaw, Michigan
- Channels: Digital: 18 (UHF); Virtual: 25

Programming
- Affiliations: 25.1: Roar; for others, see § Technical information and subchannels

Ownership
- Owner: Sinclair Broadcast Group; (WEYI Licensee, LLC)
- Sister stations: WBSF; WSMH

History
- First air date: May 4, 1953
- Former call signs: WKNX-TV (1953–1972)
- Former channel numbers: Analog: 57 (UHF, 1953–1965); 25 (UHF, 1965–2009); Digital: 30 (UHF, 2000–2019)
- Former affiliations: CBS (1953–1995); ABC (secondary, 1953–1958); NBC (1995–2025); The WB (secondary, 1999–2001)
- Call sign meaning: refers to prior CBS affiliation and eye logo

Technical information
- Licensing authority: FCC
- Facility ID: 72052
- ERP: 300 kW
- HAAT: 393 m (1,289 ft)
- Transmitter coordinates: 43°13′1″N 83°43′17″W

Links
- Public license information: Public file; LMS

WEYI-TV (channel 25) is a television station licensed to Saginaw, Michigan, United States, serving the Great Lakes Bay Region of Central Michigan with programming from the digital multicast network Roar. It is owned by Sinclair Broadcast Group alongside dual Fox/NBC affiliate WSMH (channel 66) and CW affiliate WBSF (channel 46). The three stations share studios on West Pierson Road in Mount Morris Township (with a Flint mailing address); WEYI-TV's transmitter is located in Vienna Township.

WEYI-TV is the oldest station in the Flint–Saginaw area. It began broadcasting on May 4, 1953, as WKNX-TV on channel 57. Owned by the Lake Huron Broadcasting Corporation and affiliated with CBS, the small local station did not provide primary service to the Flint area for its first two decades of operation. The station moved to the lower channel 25 in 1965. It was purchased in 1972 by the broadcasting division of the Rust Craft Greeting Card Company; Rust Craft changed the call letters to WEYI-TV and built a new studio and high-power transmitter facility near Clio, significantly improving the station's coverage. Rust Craft was purchased by Ziff-Davis in 1979, followed by a leveraged buyout of most of the Ziff-Davis station group in 1982 that formed Television Station Partners. The station remained in third place in the local news ratings; by 1989, it aired only one regular daily newscast.

In 1994, WEYI aggressively relaunched and expanded its news operation, including additional newscasts and the doubling of the news team. The station switched affiliations to NBC from CBS in January 1995 after that network signed an agreement with previous NBC affiliate WNEM-TV. Channel 25 was sold four times in eight years from 1996 to 2004; during this time, the news department continued to expand. Under Barrington Broadcasting ownership, the station launched WBSF, originally as a cable- and digital-only service and later as a standalone station to bring The WB and The CW to the market.

Howard Stirk Holdings acquired WEYI in 2013 as part of the purchase of Barrington by Sinclair Broadcast Group, with which Howard Stirk stations contract for services and management. In 2023, layoffs at Sinclair led to the downsizing of the newsroom, which began producing newscasts on weekday evenings only. On December 10, 2025, NBC programming moved to the second subchannel of WSMH.

== History ==
=== Early years ===
In August 1952, the Lake Huron Broadcasting Corporation, owner of radio station WKNX (1210 AM), (Note: This station's facilities were moved to Kingsley, Michigan, in 1997; WKNX's call sign and intellectual property were transferred to WJZZ (1250 AM) in Frankenmuth, now WJMK.) applied to the Federal Communications Commission (FCC) for a construction permit to build a television station on ultra high frequency (UHF) channel 57 in Saginaw. The FCC granted the permit on October 1, 1952.

Work was underway in early 1953, though a plan to start in March was delayed due to late equipment deliveries. Lake Huron Broadcasting built a 500-foot (150 m) tower at a studio and transmitter site in Bridgeport Township, from which WKNX radio was already broadcast. The station broadcast its first test pattern on April 5; though it had not announced it had started, WKNX-TV received reception reports from places as far away as 65 miles (105 km) from the transmitter. The station began regular programming on May 4, 1953, with all four networks—CBS, NBC, ABC, and the DuMont Television Network—represented on the lineup. The station increased its effective radiated power to 207,000 watts in 1954, which coincided with an expansion of the television studios in Bridgeport Township. Among its local programs was a local version of the Romper Room children's franchise; "Miss Carol" J. Hermance Kennedy took on the role of host in 1956.

In 1954, the FCC granted a construction permit for Flint's VHF channel 12 to Detroit radio station WJR, but this was challenged at the FCC and in the courts. Lake Huron Broadcasting emerged as an opponent of the proposed WJRT-TV, which would broadcast into WKNX-TV's service area. In January 1955, the company filed with the FCC, charging that WJRT had chosen a transmitter site expressly to take away WKNX-TV's CBS affiliation. The next year, it asked the FCC to designate channel 12 as belonging to the entire Flint–Saginaw–Bay City area so it could apply to move WKNX-TV to that channel, later simply applying for Flint's channel 12 itself. However, the FCC reaffirmed its grant of channel 12 to WJRT in April 1958. Even though WJR in Detroit was a CBS affiliate, WJRT ultimately signed with ABC, which had been a secondary affiliation for WKNX-TV and WNEM-TV.

Lake Huron Broadcasting filed in 1963 to switch channel 57 with channel 25, which had been assigned to Midland. Two years later, an FCC order supplement directed WKNX-TV to move to channel 25. The station changed channels to 25 on September 14, 1965; however, even after a power boost to 302,000 watts in 1969, Flint remained outside of its grade-A reception area. In 1969, WKNX-TV and WJIM-TV in Lansing filed a $7 million antitrust lawsuit against the American Research Bureau (ARB), a ratings service, as well as WNEM-TV and WJRT-TV. They claimed that ARB had entered into an agreement with the two stations under which it would not publish separate ratings studies for the Flint and Saginaw–Bay City areas, only on a combined basis. This hurt the two stations because WKNX-TV only served Saginaw and Bay City, while WJIM-TV served Flint in addition to Lansing.

=== Rust Craft, Ziff-Davis, and Television Station Partners ownership ===
In 1971, Lake Huron Broadcasting sold WKNX-TV to Rust Craft Broadcasting Corporation, a division of the Rust Craft Greeting Card Company that owned five other TV stations, for $1.6 million. The deal was induced by an impending proposed FCC policy that would have barred cross-ownership of AM radio stations like WKNX with television stations in the same markets; Lake Huron wished to "effectuate" the policy by making the sale.

Rust Craft moved quickly to improve the station's facilities, announcing plans for extensive improvements along with its acquisition. Following its separation from WKNX radio, channel 25 changed its call sign to WEYI-TV on June 11, 1972; the new call sign referred to the CBS eye logo. That month, construction began on a new studio near Clio in Vienna Township. The studio would be located alongside a new transmitter facility with an effective radiated power of 4 million watts—a 13-fold power increase. The new transmitter gave channel 25 primary coverage of Flint as well as Saginaw, Bay City and Midland. It also brought CBS programming to some areas of the market unable to receive Lansing's WJIM-TV or Detroit's WJBK-TV, which had previously been the default CBS affiliates in Flint. The upgrade made WEYI-TV one of the most powerful UHF stations in the country, broadcasting from the tallest structure in Michigan. Rust Craft maintained a small studio in Saginaw, where the station was still licensed. Along with the technical facelift came a significant investment in channel 25's news infrastructure, which had been relatively modest under Lake Huron's stewardship. Soon after taking over, Rust Craft sought to change this by hiring Dick Fabian, who had worked as a disc jockey at WKNX radio and a part-time reporter for channel 25, as the station's first full-time anchorman.

The new transmitter facility was activated on December 10, 1972. Studio operation did not move to Clio until January 1973 because of disputes among labor unions involved in the construction work. Rust Craft soon found it did not need all that power. For 46 days in 1976, WEYI-TV operated at half power due to a technical fault. Having received no comments from viewers then or during a January 1977 incident when utility Consumers Energy instructed major electricity consumers to reduce their energy usage, the station applied for permanent authority to reduce its power, conserving 153,000 kilowatt-hours of energy a month.

In June 1977, the Ziff Corporation, parent of magazine publisher Ziff-Davis, made a bid for Rust Craft, primarily seeking its six television stations. Ziff-Davis had previously hired I. Martin Pompadur, a former ABC executive, as part of the company's plan to acquire television stations. The Rust Craft board approved the sale that September for a total price of approximately $69 million. However, soaring valuations for broadcast properties and objections from two Rust Craft directors, who were seeking a higher return, delayed the deal and drove up its price. The original bid had been $25 a share; the board approved at $26.50 a share. By October 1978, Ziff was offering $33.50 per share. The final sales price of $33.75 a share, or $89 million in total, was approved in February 1979; the transaction already had federal approval, so the new owners were able to take over the next month. Ziff-Davis proved more receptive than Rust Craft to bolstering the small news department, which gained its first separate news director; experimented with news at 11 p.m.; and converted to electronic news gathering.

Ziff decided in 1981 to put the stations on the market, having already sold off the Rust Craft radio stations and its greeting card businesses, and focus on its publishing businesses. After having sold WRCB-TV in Chattanooga, Tennessee, and WJKS-TV in Jacksonville, Florida, Ziff then sold the remaining four outlets—WEYI; WRDW-TV in Augusta, Georgia; WROC-TV in Rochester, New York; and WTOV-TV in Steubenville, Ohio—to a group of investors led by Pompadur in a $56.2 million leveraged buyout. The new ownership was known as Television Station Partners.

After briefly being represented by NABET, station workers voted in 1988 to unionize under the banner of the United Auto Workers. It was the first time the UAW organized at a television station. A 46-day strike culminated with workers approving an agreement in August. That same year, Television Station Partners put its stations on the market; none of the offers were satisfactory to the owners, and in January 1989, the company announced its stations were no longer for sale.

Channel 25 is still where it was 10 years ago—dead last in the local three-station news-rating derby. If it were a horse race, the station's entry never left the starting gate—or maybe even the stable. It is that far behind.

— Ken Tabacsko, The Saginaw News, in 1980

In spite of the power increase and Ziff-Davis's investment in news, WEYI-TV's newscasts continued to finish in third place. In 1983, it moved its lone local newscast from 6 p.m. to 11 p.m. in hopes of using CBS prime time programming as a lead-in. Instead, ratings at 11 p.m. declined; six percent of viewers watched WEYI at 11, compared to 39 percent tuning to WNEM-TV and 32 percent watching WJRT-TV. By 1987, the station had reinstated an early newscast at 5:30 p.m. and a noon newscast, but the evening news shows attracted just three percent of the market's viewers, a small fraction of the viewership for the competing WNEM and WJRT offerings. The 11 p.m. news was dropped in 1989 due to continued low ratings. While management at the time stated a desire to restore late news within six to eight months, the station did not air a regular late newscast again until August 1992, when an 11 p.m. newscast aired for one week to cover the Buick Open and local elections.

=== New newscasts, new affiliation, new ownership ===
In January 1994, under general manager Eric Land, WEYI made a major reinvestment in its news product. Rebranded Eyewitness News, the station more than doubled its news staff, reinstated a full-length late news program, and began hourly news updates. The revamp was considerable for the station; Doug Pullen, the media columnist for The Flint Journal, noted that viewers "may be inclined to scoff" at the news and that several of his friends laughed when told of the changes.

In June 1994, as part of a deal with WNEM-TV owner Meredith Corporation instigated by a larger realignment of network television affiliations, CBS announced it would move its affiliation to the stronger WNEM-TV. NBC was rumored to be wooing WJRT, likely leaving WEYI with ABC, but Capital Cities/ABC moved to buy WJRT and WTVG in Toledo, Ohio, in October. NBC signed an affiliation agreement with WEYI in November and moved its programming from WNEM-TV on January 16, 1995.

The NBC affiliation switch provided enough of a lift in ratings that it attracted a buyer: Smith Broadcasting Group, which purchased WEYI-TV and two other stations for $63.5 million in 1995. For company president Bob Smith, a native of Bloomfield Hills, it was the first station he had owned in his home state. Smith put WEYI and other stations up for sale in 1996, only to sell it to a new joint venture of Smith and Hicks, Muse, Tate & Furst, a private equity firm that also held an increased involvement in radio station ownership. This company became known as Sunrise Television Corporation.

WEYI began broadcasting programming from The WB in overnight hours in 1999, after Superstation WGN ceased airing the network's shows nationally; this ended in 2001.

In 2000, WEYI debuted its first morning newscast, a half-hour program. After constructing a 4,480-square-foot (416 m^{2}) extension to its newsroom to provide adequate space for its increased staff, the station expanded the newscast from 30 minutes to an hour in May 2001. This was followed by noon and 5:30 p.m. broadcasts in 2002.

=== LIN and Barrington ownership; launch of WBSF ===
In January 2002, Sunrise and LIN TV—another Hicks, Muse, Tate & Furst–backed company—agreed that LIN would take over WEYI-TV under a local marketing agreement. In March, Sunrise sold the station and five others to LIN, with FCC approval granted in April 2002. LIN agreed to sell WEYI-TV for $24 million to Barrington Broadcasting in January 2004; the sale became official in May 2004. It was the first broadcast acquisition for Barrington, a company based in Hoffman Estates, Illinois, that managed eight stations. Barrington immediately shook up local management; all of the employees had to reapply for their jobs though all but five were retained. It also made improvements to the station's cable and over-the-air signal, which was inferior to that of Detroit NBC affiliate WDIV-TV on Comcast's Flint cable system. In January 2005, acting on a petition by WEYI-TV, the FCC ordered Comcast to block network programs broadcast by WDIV-TV to protect WEYI-TV. A year later, in September 2006, WDIV-TV was removed outright to make way for the new MyNetworkTV subchannel of WNEM-TV.

In 2004, three years after WEYI ended its secondary WB affiliation, Barrington Broadcasting acquired a channel 46 construction permit from ACME Communications and the rights to WB programming in the Flint–Saginaw–Bay City market, immediately launching a WB affiliate as a subchannel of its digital signal (launched on May 5, 2003) and on cable. The service was originally known as WBBC but changed to WBSF in May 2005. Channel 46 itself began broadcasting as WBSF in September 2006, in time for the merger of The WB and UPN into The CW. The WEYI subchannel also aired most of the Detroit Pistons games carried by WDWB in Detroit; unlike WKBD-TV, the previous rightsholder, WDWB was not available on cable in Flint or Saginaw.

WEYI-TV ended regular programming on its analog signal, over UHF channel 25, on June 12, 2009, the official date on which full-power television stations in the United States transitioned from analog to digital broadcasts under federal mandate. The station's digital signal remained on its pre-transition UHF channel 30, using virtual channel 25. The signal remained on channel 30 until 2019, when it moved to channel 18 as a result of the 2016 United States wireless spectrum auction. As part of the SAFER Act, WEYI-TV kept its analog signal on the air until June 26 to inform viewers of the digital television transition through a loop of public service announcements from the National Association of Broadcasters.

=== Sale to Howard Stirk Holdings and Sinclair management ===
On February 28, 2013, Barrington announced that it would sell its entire group, including WEYI and WBSF, to Sinclair Broadcast Group. Sinclair already owned a station in the market, Fox affiliate WSMH, and could not own more than one license in the market. As part of the sale, Sinclair transferred the license assets of WEYI to Howard Stirk Holdings (owned by political commentator Armstrong Williams) and of WBSF to Cunningham Broadcasting. WSMH took over the operations of both WEYI and WBSF through local marketing agreements when the deal was completed on November 25, 2013.

Effective April 27, 2015, WEYI took over duties of producing the 10 p.m. newscast for WSMH, Fox66 News at 10. WNEM-TV had previously produced WSMH's evening newscast for nearly a decade. The move led to the addition of 18 new news staffers. In 2016, Sinclair announced that the UAW had ceased representing nearly 30 WEYI-TV employees.

Sinclair announced numerous layoffs at WEYI–WSMH in March 2023, which led to a major cut in news production from the stations. The morning, 5 p.m., and weekend evening newscasts were discontinued, leaving the station to broadcast newscasts at 6 and 11 p.m.

In September 2025, Sinclair moved to buy WEYI-TV outright. On December 10, 2025, the NBC affiliation was moved to WSMH's second subchannel, while WEYI-TV's main channel flipped to Roar. The sale was completed on March 1, 2026.

=== Notable former on-air staff ===
- Jim Brandstatter – sportscaster, 1972–1975
- Joe Pagliarulo – anchor, known as Joe Parker at WEYI-TV
- Shaun Robinson – anchor, 1989
- Jennifer Valoppi – anchor, 1980–1981
- Ginger Zee – meteorologist

== Technical information and subchannels ==
WEYI-TV's transmitter is located in Vienna Township. Its signal is multiplexed, including the ATSC 1.0 feed of WBSF, the Flint market's ATSC 3.0 (NextGen TV) station:

Subchannels of WEYI-TV
Subchannel	Res.	Short name	Programming
25.1	1080i	ROAR	Roar
25.2	480i	TheNest	The Nest
25.3	480i	Quest	Quest
46.1	1080i	CW	The CW (WBSF)
46.2	480i	CHARGE!	Charge! (WBSF)

Broadcast on behalf of another station
