= WCVG =

Coordinates: 39°02′44″N 84°30′30″W

- Covington, Kentucky; United States
- Broadcast area: Cincinnati metropolitan area
- Frequency: 1320 kHz
- Branding: 1320 The Voice

Programming
- Format: Brokered programming - Urban Gospel

Ownership
- Owner: Reign Enterprizes, LLC

History
- First air date: October 1965
- Call sign meaning: City of license of Covington

Technical information
- Licensing authority: FCC
- Facility ID: 56220
- Class: B
- Power: 500 watts day 430 watts night
- Translator: 103.9 W280FW (Covington)

Links
- Public license information: Public file; LMS
- Website: www.wcvgthevoice.com

WCVG (1320 AM, "The Voice") is a commercial radio station licensed to Covington, Kentucky, and serving the Cincinnati metropolitan area. It is owned by Reign Enterprises, Inc. and airs a brokered programming radio format. Hosts buy time on WCVG and may use their shows to advertise their ministries, products or services. Programming includes Urban Gospel Christian radio along with special interest talk shows and ethnic shows.

WCVG operates with 500 watts during daytime hours and 430 watts at night, using a directional antenna at all times. Its transmitter is behind the Latonia Shopping Center in Covington. WCVG's daytime signal is directional, and resembles a "figure-8" pattern that covers the Cincinnati market inside the I-275 loop. WCVG's nighttime pattern points to the south and west and does not cover much of the Ohio portion of the market. The northern Kentucky counties still have a listenable nighttime signal, and most of Kenton County and Hamilton County is served by FM translator W280FW (103.9), which broadcasts from a site on Ryan Avenue in the Mount Auburn neighborhood north of the downtowns of Cincinnati and Covington.

== History ==
=== Country WCLU ===
In October 1965, the station first signed on as WCLU, owned by WCLU Broadcasting Company, Inc. It was headed by former Kansas City radio executive Irving Schwartz. WCLU was a daytime-only station, that was required to go off the air at night to avoid interfering with other stations on 1320 AM.

WCLU played Country music and went by the "Big CLU Country" nickname. The station also ran auto racing, Notre Dame Fighting Irish football, and Cleveland Browns football.

=== Top 40 Era ===
In 1981, WCLU switched to a Top 40 format. The city's former AM Top 40 station, 1360 WSAI, had switched to country in 1978. WCLU had a decidedly "New Wave" sound until about 1983, when the station became "Cincinnati's Hit Playin' AM" and was dubbed "CLU-132." It was a moniker that sounded very similar to the city's FM Top 40 powerhouse station WKRQ, or "Q-102."

In 1985, announcers on the station stopped calling it "CLU-132" and went with the easier to say and remember, "AM 1320 WCLU." The Top 40 incarnation of WCLU, which operated only during the daytime, was plagued by a weak signal, a lack of a promotional budget, and technical problems such as records frequently skipping. However, this era of WCLU had a few loyal fans who still hold the station in very high regard because of Q-102's restrictive playlist.

=== All Elvis and Sports Talk ===
In April 1987, Schwartz sold the station to Richard L. Plessinger, who also owned WJOJ-FM in Milford, Ohio and WAXZ (Georgetown, Ohio). Plessinger moved the studios from Covington to the WJOJ studios in Milford. WCLU's call sign was changed to WCVG and the format became "Kwick-Sell Classifieds." During this format, the station played soft adult contemporary music from the WJOJ library, and ran free on-air classified ads at specified times. The station also received permission from the Federal Communications Commission to operate with nighttime service during this time.

In mid 1987, WCVG switched to a contemporary country format. That didn't last long as WCVG became the country's first "All Elvis" station, the brainchild of Steve Parton, in the summer of 1988. WCVG launched the "All Elvis" format on August 1, 1988. It remained all-Elvis until the 12th anniversary of Elvis' death, August 16, 1989. On that date, WCVG became an affiliate of the Business Radio Network with 24 hours of business news and talk.

WCVG later became a Country/Sports Talk mix format as "Sports-Country 1320" in 1992. A satellite-delivered country music format aired during most of the day, with local sports talk programs airing on weekends and evenings. These shows emphasized northern Kentucky high school and Cincinnati professional sports talk. It was during this format that the station's studios were moved back into the Latonia site.

=== Gospel and Regional Mexican ===
In 1993, WCVG started a long run as the city's Urban Gospel station under business arrangements with groups such as Kingdom Life Ministries. That ended in April 2006, when Plessinger switched the station's format to Classic Country.

In July 2006, the station was purchased for $1.9 million by Davidson Media and began transitioning to Regional Mexican music in the Spanish language under Program Director Mayra Arroyo and General Manager Simon Cipriano. On July 16, 2006, the station began using the nickname "La Ley" Radio. The station's Latino/Hispanic music broadcasts included contemporary Mexican music and tropical rhythms such as salsa and bachata.

On September 8, 2008, WCVG returned to its Urban Gospel format under the same management that had previously operated it. That group, TMH Media Inc. was approved for ownership of the station on June 23, 2009. However, the deal was never consummated and despite extensions filed with the FCC, the station's transmitter was shut off on Thursday, December 10, 2009.

A Silent STA Application (required when a station intends to go silent, but keep its license) was filed with the FCC on January 14, 2010. It was dismissed on March 30, 2010. The station returned to the air with a Gospel music format after the station was sold by Davidson Media to Great Lakes Radio-Cincinnati, LLC. The deal was approved by the FCC on April 8, 2010, and consummated on June 8, 2010.

WCVG was the 2013 home for the Florence Freedom play-by-play broadcasts. The team belongs to the independent Frontier League.

According to "Radio World", WCVG was bought by Reign Enterprises from Great Lakes Radio-Cincinnati in July 2016.
