= WHZZ =

- Lansing, Michigan; United States
- Broadcast area: Lansing-Jackson, Michigan
- Frequency: 101.7 MHz
- Branding: 101.7 Mike FM

Programming
- Format: Variety hits

Ownership
- Owner: MacDonald Broadcasting
- Sister stations: WILS, WQHH, WXLA

History
- First air date: January 1967 (as WILS-FM)
- Former call signs: WILS-FM (3/24/92-5/15/95); WLYY (4/15/91-3/24/92); WKKP (5/5/89-4/15/91); WILS-FM (1967-5/5/89)
- Call sign meaning: Hitz (a reference to its former Top 40 format)

Technical information
- Licensing authority: FCC
- Facility ID: 39538
- Class: A
- ERP: 4,100 watts
- HAAT: 121 meters
- Transmitter coordinates: 42°41′29″N 84°33′29″W

Links
- Public license information: Public file; LMS
- Webcast: Listen Live
- Website: 1017mikefm.com

WHZZ (101.7 FM, "Mike FM") is a radio station licensed to Lansing, Michigan with a variety hits format.

== History ==
The station has gone through many different formats over the years. After beginning as a simulcast of WILS 1320 AM as WILS-FM in 1967, the station separated programming in the late 1960s with an automated MOR format (with the exception of the Jerry Marshall morning show, which was simulcast with WILS-AM from 6 to 10 a.m.). In 1972, WILS-FM launched an automated Country format which was branded as "Hit Country", although the morning simulcast continued. In 1975, WILS-FM abandoned the Country format in favor of a 12-hour daily simulcast with WILS-AM, followed by split programming in the evening, which included an AOR format from 6 p.m. to midnight, and a Jazz format from midnight to 6 a.m.. In 1978, WILS-FM abandoned the overnight Jazz and ended the simulcast with WILS-AM, programming the AOR format full time. The AOR format proved to be quite successful for the station, resulting in respectable ratings despite WILS-FM's 3KW signal.

In August 1983 WILS-AM and WILS-FM's original owner Lansing Broadcasting, sold the station to Sentry Broadcasting (a division of Sentry Insurance) The new management made changes quickly, deciding to automate sister station WILS-AM with a Nostalgia format; in December 1983, most of the WILS-FM air staff, including the highly rated morning team of Douglas "Doug" Burton and Danny "Dan" Ballard, were let go, and were replaced by announcers from WILS-AM. On April 14, 1984, WILS-FM abruptly changed to an Adult Contemporary format using the brand name WILS FM 102 to compete with top-rated WFMK. The station's ratings plummeted and would not recover for over a decade as 101.7 FM went through unsuccessful tries at Hot AC as WKKP, and then later as WLYY, and Country formats (the latter with a return to the WILS-FM calls in the early 1990s). The station also went through a number of ownership changes during this period. Sentry Insurance dissolved their radio division and sold WILS to Northstar Broadcasting in 1986, and after going through an upper-management shakeup, Northstar sold the station to current owner MacDonald Broadcasting in 1989.

In the spring of 1995, WILS-FM became WHZZ under their new moniker Z101.7. WHZZ filled the void as the new Top 40/CHR station for Lansing after WVIC-FM dropped its longtime CHR format to compete with country market leader WITL. WHZZ was frequently criticized by CHR aficionados for featuring an overly conservative adult-oriented playlist heavy on Hot AC chart currents and 1980's and 1990's gold, but the station enjoyed good Arbitron ratings during their Top 40/CHR run, and even reached #1 overall (12+) at least once.

On September 13, 2005, WHZZ unexpectedly flipped to adult hits as "Mike FM". Two days after WHZZ's flip, the CHR format was picked up by WJIM-FM.

== See also ==
- Dave FM
- Hank FM
- Jack FM
- Joe FM
- Sam FM
