= WXLA =

- Dimondale, Michigan; United States
- Broadcast area: Lansing–East Lansing metropolitan area
- Frequency: 1180 kHz
- Branding: Easy 93.3

Programming
- Format: Soft AC
- Affiliations: Michigan Radio Network

Ownership
- Owner: MacDonald Broadcasting
- Sister stations: WHZZ, WILS, WQHH

History
- First air date: September 20, 1982; 43 years ago (as WDTB)
- Former call signs: WDTB (8/27/79-6/29/84)

Technical information
- Licensing authority: FCC
- Facility ID: 16848
- Class: D
- Power: 10,000 watts daytime 2,000 watts critical hours 500 watts PSRA
- Transmitter coordinates: 42°39′1″N 84°34′49″W
- Translator: 93.3 W227DO (Lansing)

Links
- Public license information: Public file; LMS
- Website: www.easy933.com

WXLA (1180 kHz) is a commercial AM radio station licensed to Dimondale, a suburb of Lansing, Michigan. It is owned by MacDonald Broadcasting and airs a soft adult contemporary radio format. During the months of November and December, the station switches to an all-Christmas music format. It uses the branding "Easy 93.3". The dial position refers to WXLA's FM translator, W227DO at 93.3 MHz in Lansing.

The station is a daytimer but the FM translator broadcasts around the clock. WXLA is powered at 10,000 watts during daylight hours. For two hours after sunrise and two hours before sunset it cuts back to 2,000 watts. For some months of the year, WXLA is authorized to broadcast at 500 watts starting at 6 AM local time under Pre-sunrise authorization. WXLA must sign-off at sunset to protect from interference Class A clear channel station WHAM in Rochester, New York. The transmitter is off Grovenburg Road in Lansing.

== History ==
The station signed on the air on September 20, 1982 as WDTB. It originally broadcast on 1170 kHz with 1,000 watts, days only. It used the all news programming of CNN Headline News. The call letters were changed to the present WXLA on June 29, 1984.

WXLA was the first radio station to program specifically to Lansing's African-American community with an urban contemporary / R&B format. In July 2005, the station increased its power and began referring to itself as 10,000 Watt 1180. With its new directional antenna, the station could be heard as far away as Grand Rapids, Bay City and Flint.

In 2006, MacDonald Broadcasting purchased WXLA and sister station 96.5 WQHH for $3.65 million. MacDonald switched from the urban adult contemporary format (as "Mix 1180") to ABC Radio's "Timeless" (formerly known as "Stardust") Middle of the Road/Oldies/Adult Standards format in October 2006. The Timeless Classics format had previously aired on co-owned "Unforgettable 1320" WILS and was moved to WXLA to make room for a new talk format on WILS.

In 2010, with the demise of Citadel Media's Timeless format, WXLA flipped to Dial Global's "America's Best Music" format, which features many of the same songs that Timeless played but also incorporated more traditional adult standards material and pre-1960s hits. (America's Best Music has since evolved to mostly Soft Oldies with a few adult standards songs in the playlist.) Despite the fact that the actual "Timeless Favorites" format is no more, WXLA continues to use the phrase "Timeless Favorites" in its imaging.

On August 11, 2020, WXLA changed their format from adult standards to soft adult contemporary, branded as "Easy 93.3" (simulcast on FM translator W227DO 93.3 FM Lansing).
