= WKCQ =

- Saginaw, Michigan; United States
- Broadcast area: Saginaw-Bay City-Midland-Flint
- Frequency: 98.1 MHz
- Branding: 98-KCQ

Programming
- Format: Country

Ownership
- Owner: MacDonald Broadcasting
- Sister stations: WMJO, WSAM, WSAG

History
- Former call signs: WSAM-FM

Technical information
- Licensing authority: FCC
- Facility ID: 65927
- Class: B
- Power: 50,000 watts
- HAAT: 150 meters
- Transmitter coordinates: 43°25′4″N 83°55′6″W

Links
- Public license information: Public file; LMS
- Website: 98fmkcq.com

WKCQ (98.1 FM) is a radio station licensed to Saginaw, Michigan, and broadcasting on 98.1 mHz with an effective radiated power of 50,000 watts. The station has broadcast a popular country music format since 1968 (the country format began under the station's original calls of WSAM-FM).

From 1992 through 2017, the station hosted a free concert on Ojibway Island in downtown Saginaw. Under the right conditions it could be heard all the way in Port Sanilac. it competes with WCEN-FM. Nearby competition also includes WITL-FM in Lansing in Ingham County, Michigan.

== Sources ==
- Michiguide.com - WKCQ History
