= WILS =

- Lansing, Michigan; United States
- Broadcast area: Lansing-East Lansing metropolitan area
- Frequency: 1320 kHz
- Branding: 1320 WILS

Programming
- Format: Talk radio
- Network: Fox News Radio
- Affiliations: NBC News Radio; Compass Media Networks; Premiere Networks; Salem Radio Network; Westwood One

Ownership
- Owner: MacDonald Broadcasting
- Sister stations: WHZZ, WQHH, WXLA

History
- First air date: February 19, 1947
- Call sign meaning: Ingham County, Lansing

Technical information
- Licensing authority: FCC
- Facility ID: 39537
- Class: B
- Power: 25,000 watts day; 1,900 watts night
- Transmitter coordinates: 42°37′19″N 84°38′38″W

Links
- Public license information: Public file; LMS
- Webcast: Listen live
- Website: www.1320wils.com

WILS (1320 AM) is a commercial radio station in Lansing, Michigan. It is owned by MacDonald Broadcasting and airs a talk radio format. It features a local news department and a mixture of local and national talk personalities. The studios and offices are on West Cavanaugh Street in Lansing.

WILS is powered at 25,000 watts by day. To protect other stations on AM 1320, it reduces power to 1,900 watts at night. It uses a directional antenna day and night. The transmitter is located off North Green Road in Dimondale.

== Programming ==
WILS is home to the locally produced "Morning Wakeup with Mike Austin". It is heard weekdays, focusing on local issues and politics. The program was formerly hosted by Dave Akerly. Syndicated talk shows round out the rest of the weekday schedule: Glenn Beck, Sean Hannity, Rick Valdes, Lars Larson, Dennis Prager, Coast to Coast AM and America in the Morning. Weekends include shows on money, health, real estate and technology. Syndicated programs include The Kim Komando Show and Rich DeMuro on Tech. Some weekend hours are paid brokered programming. Most hours begin with world and national news from Fox News Radio.

WILS became the only full-time talk radio station in the market on December 1, 2025, as longtime competitor WJIM (1240 AM) - also licensed to Lansing - changed to a sports format.

== History ==
=== Early years ===
WILS signed on the air on February 19, 1947. It was a daytimer at 1430 kHz with 500 watts of power, and required to go off the air at night. The transmitter for the station was on East Mount Hope Avenue, with studios in downtown Lansing at Saginaw and North Washington.

In March 1950, the station moved to 1320 AM. It increased power to 1,000 watts with a directional antenna array located at 600 W. Cavanaugh Road. In 1952, the Federal Communications Commission granted WILS another increase in its power, this time to 5,000 watts daytime and 1,000 watts nighttime, using separate directional arrays. In 1966, the studios were moved from downtown to the Cavanaugh Road site, where they remain today.

=== TV stations ===
The Lansing Broadcasting Company, original owners of WILS, made two attempts to enter the world of television. The first was an unsuccessful UHF station, WILS-TV, which began broadcasts in 1953. A year later, the company leased it to another group, under which it operated as WTOM-TV until its 1956 demise. By that time, WILS was chasing a VHF allotment to Parma and Onondaga, proposing to share time with a station to be run by Michigan State University.

WILS's second and more successful station, WILX-TV channel 10, went on the air March 15, 1959. It was owned by Jackson Telecasters, a company in which Lansing Broadcasting owned a 50 percent stake, along with WJCO radio (AM 1510, now WJKN).

=== Top 40 era ===
WILS was a popular Top 40 music station in Lansing during the 1960s and 1970s. One noted WILS personality during the 1960s Top 40 era was John Records Landecker, who later went on to great success at WLS in Chicago, WPHR in Cleveland and CFTR in Toronto. Timmy O' Toole, another popular Chicago radio personality, worked at WILS from 1969 to 1971 before he joined WLUP in 1977. He later was heard weekends on WLS-FM in Chicago. WILS was a fully-staffed live radio station until January 17, 1984, when the station switched to mostly automated programming and was known as Hometown Radio 1320.

The WILS call sign was also shared with a sister station at 101.7 FM, WILS-FM (now WHZZ). From 1967 to 1972, WILS-AM-FM simulcast a popular Top 40 format. In 1972, WILS-FM flipped to country music. However Jerry Marshall's morning show, which originated on WILS, continued to be heard on WILS-FM as well. Three years later, in 1975, WILS-FM returned to a twelve-hour simulcast of the AM station in the daytime, followed by six hours of progressive rock in the evenings and jazz overnight. The rock format was so popular that WILS-FM completely broke away from the AM station in 1978. The station was dubbed Rockradio WILS 101 FM.

=== Sentry Insurance and Northstar Broadcasting ===
WILS and WILS-FM were purchased by Sentry Broadcasting, a subsidiary of the Sentry Insurance Company, in August 1983, signaling format changes for both stations. WILS abandoned its live full-service adult contemporary format in favor of Drake-Chenault's "Hitparade" soft hits format in January 1984. (The Larry King Show continued to air overnight). WILS-FM dropped its album rock format as 101-ILS in April 1984, switching to a soft adult contemporary format branded as Love Songs LS-102. The Hitparade format on WILS was dropped in the fall of 1984 with the switch to Drake Chenault's "Lite Hits" automated format, closely matching the sound of WILS-FM. Morning drive and weekend dayparts were simulcast with live personalities on the FM side.

Sentry Insurance made the decision to divest their radio properties in 1986, leading to the sale of WILS and WILS-FM to Lansing-based Northstar Broadcasting in the fall of that year. WILS switched to an urban contemporary format in September 1987, once again utilizing a Drake-Chenault format called "Urban One", with the station branded as 1320 Jams. Morning drive was hosted by local air personality Michael McFadden, who also served as the station's program director.

WILS became the first 24-hour urban contemporary station in the Lansing market as then-competitor WXLA was limited to daytime-only operation. The urban format proved to be a success and continued until 1992, shortly after WXLA launched a sister FM station, WQHH, with a competing urban contemporary format. WQHH proved to be a significant competitor with its FM stereo signal, leading to the eventual end of the urban format on WILS. (WXLA and WQHH would later become sister stations of WILS.)

=== MacDonald Broadcasting ===
WILS was purchased by MacDonald Broadcasting, owner of several other stations in the Saginaw and Traverse City markets. The station switched briefly to a country music format (simulcast with WILS-FM) in 1992, and then flipped to adult standards in 1993. It was known as Unforgettable 1320 and was an affiliate of ABC Radio's satellite-delivered adult standards/MOR music package known as "Timeless Classics" (formerly "Stardust").

The station had had this format since the early 1990s and was quite successful in the ratings with it. The Timeless Favorites format moved to sister WXLA after that station was purchased by MacDonald Broadcasting. WILS and WXLA essentially simulcast their programming with separate IDs and imaging until 2006. WILS changed its format to all-talk. It used the slogan More Stimulating Talk Radio airing personalities such as Laura Ingraham, Clark Howard, Dennis Miller, and Michael Savage. Local personalities included then morning show host Walt Sorg, followed by Chris Holman, Tony Conley and former WLNS-TV news anchor Dave Akerly, heard in morning drive. Sports talk show host Jack Ebling was an afternoon fixture on WILS before moving to WQTX. In 2010, the station changed its slogan to the current More Compelling Talk Radio moniker.

On January 25, 2008, WILS turned on a new Windsor Township transmitter and became the most powerful AM station in Lansing. The 25,000-watt daytime signal covers much of Mid-Michigan, and be easily received as far away as Grand Rapids, Kalamazoo, Mt. Pleasant, and Jackson. The directional pattern of WILS is limited to the east to avoid adjacent channel interference with WTRX (1330 AM) in Flint. The station switches to a 1,900-watt signal at night.
