= Robin Glen-Indiantown, Michigan =

Robin Glen–Indiantown, Michigan
- Census-designated place (CDP) & unincorporated community
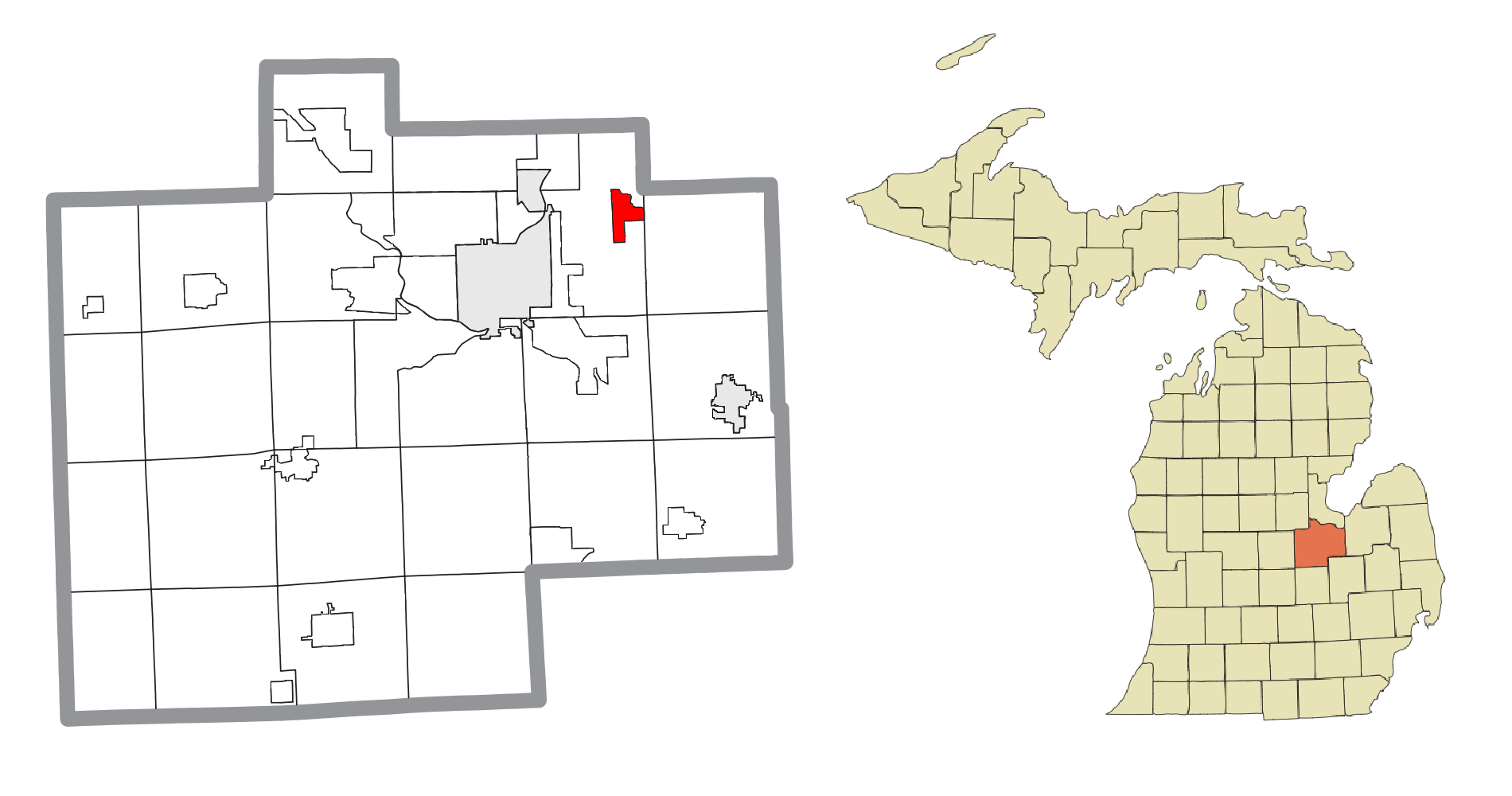
- Location within Saginaw County

- Location within the state of Michigan
- Coordinates: 43°27′43″N 83°50′13″W
- Country: United States
- State: Michigan
- County: Saginaw
- Township: Buena Vista

Area
  - Total: 2.81 sq mi (7.27 km^{2})
  - Land: 2.81 sq mi (7.27 km^{2})
  - Water: 0 sq mi (0.00 km^{2})
- Elevation: 584 ft (178 m)

Population (2020)
  - Total: 674
  - Density: 240.2/sq mi (92.75/km^{2})
- Time zone: UTC-5 (Eastern (EST))
  - Summer (DST): UTC-4 (EDT)
- ZIP code(s): 48601 (Saginaw)
- Area code: 989
- FIPS code: 26-68990
- GNIS feature ID: 2393209

Robin Glen-Indiantown is a census-designated place (CDP) in Buena Vista Charter Township, Saginaw County in the U.S. state of Michigan. The CDP is used for statistical purposes and has no legal status as an incorporated municipality. As of the 2020 census, Robin Glen-Indiantown had a population of 674.

The CDP includes the unincorporated community of Indiantown near the junction of N. Portsmouth Rd and Becker Rd at 43°28′20″N 83°50′12″W The CDP also includes the Robin Glen Mobile Home Community at the southwest corner of E. Washington Rd (M-81) and N. Portsmouth.

Indiantown is an important location for broadcasters in Mid-Michigan, with the community being home to three 1,000 foot communications towers. Television stations WNEM and WBSF, as well as radio stations WIOG and WSGW broadcast from Indiantown. Furthermore, WMJO and WHNN also broadcast from the Indiantown area, however their transmitters are physically located in Munger and Quanicassee, respectively.

== Geography ==
According to the United States Census Bureau, the CDP has a total area of 2.1 square miles (5.4 km^{2}), all land.

== Demographics ==
Historical population
Census	Pop.	Note	%±
2020	674		—
U.S. Decennial Census

As of the census of 2000, there were 1,158 people, 463 households, and 306 families residing in the CDP. The population density was 540.7 inhabitants per square mile (208.8/km^{2}). There were 489 housing units at an average density of 228.3 per square mile (88.1/km^{2}). The racial makeup of the CDP was 91.71% White, 2.33% African American, 0.52% Native American, 2.59% from other races, and 2.85% from two or more races. Hispanic or Latino of any race were 6.65% of the population.

There were 463 households, out of which 39.5% had children under the age of 18 living with them, 41.9% were married couples living together, 19.2% had a female householder with no husband present, and 33.7% were non-families. 27.0% of all households were made up of individuals, and 4.5% had someone living alone who was 65 years of age or older. The average household size was 2.50 and the average family size was 3.03.

In the CDP, the population was spread out, with 30.3% under the age of 18, 9.3% from 18 to 24, 35.5% from 25 to 44, 18.7% from 45 to 64, and 6.1% who were 65 years of age or older. The median age was 30 years. For every 100 females, there were 99.0 males. For every 100 females age 18 and over, there were 95.9 males.

The median income for a household in the CDP was $31,613, and the median income for a family was $31,908. Males had a median income of $31,500 versus $15,625 for females. The per capita income for the CDP was $19,145. About 15.9% of families and 14.9% of the population were below the poverty line, including 24.0% of those under age 18 and 14.3% of those age 65 or over.
