= WSAG =

- Linwood, Michigan; United States
- Broadcast area: Greater Tri-Cities
- Frequency: 104.1 MHz
- Branding: 1400 AM & 104 FM The Bay

Programming
- Format: Soft adult contemporary

Ownership
- Owner: MacDonald Broadcasting
- Sister stations: WKCQ, WMJO, WSAM

History
- First air date: November 2002
- Call sign meaning: SAGinaw, Michigan

Technical information
- Licensing authority: FCC
- Facility ID: 87624
- Class: A
- ERP: 4,600 watts
- HAAT: 99 meters (325 ft)
- Transmitter coordinates: 43°43′30″N 83°56′30″W
- Repeater: 1400 WSAM (Saginaw, Michigan)

Links
- Public license information: Public file; LMS
- Website: thebay104fm.com

WSAG (104.1 FM) is a radio station licensed to Linwood, Michigan, providing a rimshot service to the Saginaw, Bay City, and Midland markets. The station is simulcasted with AM sister station WSAM at 1400 kHz in Saginaw, Michigan, and are collectively known as The Bay, in reference to their close proximity to the Saginaw Bay.

== History ==
The current format began in April 2005. Previously, WSAM had programmed adult standards under the name "Sam 1400 AM", and WSAG (originally licensed to Pinconning, Michigan before the city of license changed to Linwood, an unincorporated community north of Bay City) had broadcast an automated, commercial-free mix of 1950s-1970s oldies since opening in November 2002. During the 1960s and 1970s, WSAM was a popular top 40 music station; during the 1980s, it played oldies. Serendipitously, during WSAM's period as an oldies station, the long-held call letters lent themselves to the tagline "Play it Again, Sam". WSAM's original FM station at 98.1 MHz is now WKCQ and has programmed a highly rated country music format since 1968. MacDonald Broadcasting has owned WSAM-AM and WSAM-FM/WKCQ continuously since 1962, with sister stations WSAG and WMJO added later.

Previous logo

== Programming ==
WSAM and WSAG are simulcast around the clock, except for some popular weekend polka shows on WSAM which are a holdover from the now-defunct adult standards format. Like most other adult contemporary music stations, The Bay switches to a format of continuous Christmas music during the months of November and December, primarily competing with crosstown adult contemporary formatted WHNN, but also a portion of the signal area of WCRZ from Flint as of more recently, for the holiday music audience.

== Technical ==
WSAG-FM's reception is strongest in the Bay City area but is very difficult to receive near the Flint and Lapeer area, as WOMC-FM tends to phase out the signal that far south, as well as WRSR 103.9; however, its signal can be received as far north as West Branch and Tawas City. WSAG's signal is also scratchy in parts of Saginaw itself, perhaps due to the proximity of WILZ on 104.5 FM. WSAM-AM is more easily received in Flint and Lapeer on car radios, but farther south it too runs into reception problems due to co-channel WDTK in Detroit.

== Sources ==
- Michiguide.com - WSAG History
- Michiguide.com - WSAM History
