= WQHH =

- DeWitt, Michigan; United States
- Broadcast area: Lansing, Michigan
- Frequency: 96.5 MHz
- Branding: Power 96.5

Programming
- Format: Urban/Hip hop

Ownership
- Owner: MacDonald Broadcasting
- Sister stations: WHZZ, WILS, WXLA

History
- First air date: May 26, 1991
- Call sign meaning: Hip-Hop

Technical information
- Licensing authority: FCC
- Facility ID: 41819
- Class: A
- ERP: 6,000 watts
- HAAT: 98 meters
- Transmitter coordinates: 42°50′58″N 84°40′4″W

Links
- Public license information: Public file; LMS
- Webcast: Listen Live
- Website: power965fm.com

WQHH (96.5 FM), branded "Power 96.5" is a commercial FM radio station located in DeWitt, a suburb of Lansing, Michigan. The station broadcasts with 6,000 watts. The station plays hip hop as well as rhythm & blues (R&B) music.

WQHH began broadcasting on May 26, 1991 with 3,000 watts and led by Radio Veteran & Legend Larry "Doc" Eliott who later signed his cousin Danny Drake from WTLZ Power 107 - Saginaw, Michigan to do afternoon drive. Power was increased to the present 6,000 watts in July, 2003

In 2006, MacDonald Broadcasting purchased WQHH and sister station WXLA for $3.65 million. The studios were moved from DeWitt to Lansing at that time. MacDonald Broadcasting also replaced the local morning hosts with the Tom Joyner Show. In October 2008, the Rickey Smiley Morning Show took over the morning slot, replacing Tom Joyner. Beginning April 3, 2017, The Breakfast Club is now the morning show from 6-10am on weekdays.

== Sources ==
- Michiguide.com - WQHH History
