= Jennifer Valoppi =

American television journalist and producer

- Education: Oakland University (BA)
- Occupations: television journalist; producer; author
- Years active: 1981-present
- Spouse: Christian de Berdouare (m. 1997)
- Children: 2
- Website: jennifervaloppi.com

Jennifer Valoppi is an American television journalist, producer and author known for her work on WTVJ.

== Early life and education ==
Raised in Allen Park, Michigan, Valoppi graduated with a Bachelor of Arts degree in psychology from Oakland University, Michigan. Her mother was a singer.

== Career ==
Valoppi began her career as a weather-caster and science editor for WEYI, the CBS affiliate in Flint, Michigan, in 1981 and was immediately named "Best Weathercaster".

From 1981 to 1984, Valoppi was an anchor and investigative reporter for NBC affiliate WPTV in West Palm Beach, where she won the United Press International's Award for "Best Investigative Work," for the series A Shot In The Dark, in which she helped free a man facing the electric chair.

From 1994 to 2005, Valoppi was a lead anchor a WTVJ in Miami. She was then news anchor at New York's WWOR-TV for 7 years.

Valoppi created and produced for WWOR two series of Money, Power and Influence, I and II, which was nominated for "Best New Syndicated Program," and won two New York Emmy Awards for "Best On-Air Talent" and "Best Entertainment Special."

who has been recognized on the floor of the United States Congress, and is a 2006 recipient of Florida Governor Jeb Bush's Points of Light Award.

=== Women of Tomorrow Mentor & Scholarship Program ===
Valoppi is founder and president of the Women of Tomorrow Mentor & Scholarship Program. Valoppi is directing its national expansion with the help of a grant of $3 million from the John S. & James L. Knight Foundation.

== Personal life ==
Valoppi is married to Christian de Berdouare, the owner of the Chicken Kitchen restaurant chain. They met in 1994 after she had recently moved to the area to take the job at NBC 6.They got married in a small ceremony on Fisher Island in 1997. They have two sons, Julian and Jordan.

== Filmography ==
=== Film ===
Year	Title	Role	Notes
1996	Up Close & Personal	Miami Reporter	

=== Television ===
Year	Title	Role	Notes
1991	To Tell the Truth	—N/a	Episode: "Marni Nixon/Gene Dyke/Robert Nordyke"
1992	One to One	—N/a	Episode: "Diahann Carroll"
2014	Graceland	Reporter	Episode: "Connects"

=== Literature ===
Year	Title	Publisher	Category	Notes
2017	The Way It Was: My Life with Frank Sinatra	Hatchette Books	Memoir, Nonfiction	Hardcover / Paperback / Audiobook / Kindle
2020	Certain Cure: Where Science Meets Religion	Murray Hill Press	Literature & Fiction, Medical Thriller	Paperback / Audiobook / Kindle

== Awards and honors ==
- City of Miami Commission on the Status of Women 2004 Honorees
- Congressman Mario Diaz-Balart Honor Ms. Jennifer Valoppi on CapitolWords by the Sunlight Foundation
- Finalist Diane Von Furstenberg's Most Iconic Women
