= WAGY =

- Forest City, North Carolina; United States
- Frequency: 1320 kHz

Programming
- Format: Oldies

Ownership
- Owner: Calvin and Teresa Hastings; (KTC Broadcasting, Inc.)

History
- First air date: 1958

Technical information
- Licensing authority: FCC
- Facility ID: 70700
- Class: B
- Power: 1,000 watts (day); 300 watts (night)
- Transmitter coordinates: 35°21′16.4″N 81°52′45.5″W
- Translator: 107.5 W298CZ (Forest City)

Links
- Public license information: Public file; LMS
- Website: www.wagyfm.com

WAGY (1320 AM) is a radio station airing an oldies format, licensed to Forest City, North Carolina, United States, The station is owned by Calvin and Teresa Hastings, through licensee KTC Broadcasting, Inc.

== FM translator ==
Broadcast translator for WAGY
| Call sign | Frequency | City of license | FID | ERP (W) | HAAT | Class | Transmitter coordinates | FCC info |
|---|---|---|---|---|---|---|---|---|
| W298CZ | 107.5 FM | Forest City, North Carolina | 202870 | 250 | 0 m (0 ft) | D | 35°21′16.5″N 81°52′47.7″W | LMS |
