= KRLW =

- Walnut Ridge, Arkansas; United States
- Broadcast area: Jonesboro, Arkansas
- Frequency: 1320 kHz
- Branding: Oldies 1320

Programming
- Format: Oldies
- Affiliations: ABC Radio

Ownership
- Owner: Combined Media Group, Inc.

History
- First air date: 1951

Technical information
- Licensing authority: FCC
- Facility ID: 70466
- Class: D
- Power: 1,000 watts day 152 watts night
- Transmitter coordinates: 36°3′58″N 90°56′24″W
- Translators: 100.1 K261EX (Walnut Ridge); 103.1 K276FJ (Walnut Ridge)

Links
- Public license information: Public file; LMS

KRLW (1320 AM) is a radio station broadcasting an oldies format. Licensed to Walnut Ridge, Arkansas, United States, the station serves the Jonesboro area. The station is currently owned by Combined Media Group, Inc. and features programming from ABC Radio.
