= XEARZ-AM =

Radio station in Mexico City

- Mexico City; Mexico
- Broadcast area: Greater Mexico City
- Frequency: 1320 kHz
- Branding: ZER Radio

Programming
- Format: Easy Listening Instrumental Music

Ownership
- Owner: Grupo Radiofónico ZER; (Arnoldo Rodríguez Zermeño)

History
- First air date: April 2012
- Former frequencies: 1650 kHz (2012–2021)
- Call sign meaning: Initials of concessionaire

Technical information
- Licensing authority: CRT
- Class: B
- Power: 5 kW
- Transmitter coordinates: 19°26′32.6″N 99°10′05.5″W

Links
- Webcast: Listen live
- Website: grupozer.mx

XEARZ-AM (1320 kHz) is a commercial radio station in Mexico City. It airs an easy listening instrumental music format, under the name "ZER Radio." The station is owned by Arnoldo Rodríguez Zermeño, the head of Grupo Radiofónico ZER.

XEARZ is powered at 5,000 watts, using a non-directional antenna. The transmitter is on Calle Zopaltzin in the Granada neighborhood of Mexico City.

== History ==
XEARZ-AM received its permit to operate with 5,000 watts on 1650 kHz on November 30, 2011, though Zermeño had been pursuing it since 2004. After construction and tests, XEARZ-AM signed on the air in April 2012.

It is the newest of Mexico City's AM radio stations, likely because its original home was on the AM expanded band. AM Stations between 1610 and 1700 were not available until the 1990s.

Zermeño owns stations in the states of Aguascalientes, Colima, Jalisco, Sonora and Zacatecas in addition to XEARZ-AM.

In April 2021, the Federal Telecommunications Institute ordered XEARZ to move to 1320 kHz. The frequency had become open due to the closure of XENET-AM (whose concession expired in 2016). The IFT required the move because the AM expanded band was reserved in 2014 for new community and indigenous stations. Existing stations above 1600 kHz were asked to move off the band where feasible. The station relocated to 1320 kHz in October 2021.
