= WMJO =

- Essexville, Michigan; United States
- Broadcast area: Greater Tri-Cities
- Frequency: 97.3 MHz
- Branding: 97.3 Joe FM

Programming
- Format: Variety hits

Ownership
- Owner: MacDonald Broadcasting
- Sister stations: WKCQ, WSAM, WSAG

History
- First air date: circa 1991 (as WIXC)
- Former call signs: WEEG (1/5/99-6/24/04); WIXC (9/6/91-1/5/99)
- Call sign meaning: W M JOe FM

Technical information
- Licensing authority: FCC
- Facility ID: 73111
- Class: A
- ERP: 3,000 watts
- HAAT: 100 meters
- Transmitter coordinates: 43°30′51″N 83°45′51″W

Links
- Public license information: Public file; LMS
- Website: 973joefm.com

WMJO (97.3 FM, "Joe FM") is a radio station licensed to Essexville, Michigan and broadcasting at 97.3 MHz with an effective radiated power of 3,000 watts. Known on the air as Joe-FM, WMJO has a variety hits format targeted to Saginaw, Bay City, and Midland. The station is one of four locally owned MacDonald Broadcasting radio stations.

It first began broadcasting in 1991 under the WIXC call sign (now used by a sports radio station in Titusville, Florida). The station switched from country when it was purchased by MacDonald in 1998. Since MacDonald owned then competitor WKCQ, the station's format was flipped to classic rock and was known as Eagle 97.3 with the call sign WEEG. In 2004, the station became Joe-FM, a variety hits format modeled after Jack FM, and changed its call signs once again to WMJO. The station originally had the same playlist and shared personalities with sister station WHZZ 101.7 FM Mike FM in Lansing, Michigan. WMJO eventually evolved into a more gold-based Classic Hits format and is considered a hybrid Adult and Classic Hits station rather than a true variety hits station like WHZZ. However both stations continue to use the same imaging.

WMJO 97.3 was the exclusive radio broadcaster of the OHL's Saginaw Spirit ice hockey team. Spirit games are now broadcast on WSGW (100.5).

== Sources ==
- Michiguide.com - WMJO History
