= Channel 66 virtual TV stations in the United States =

The following television stations operate on virtual channel 66 in the United States:

- KFSF-DT in Vallejo, California
- KPXO-TV in Kaneohe, Hawaii
- WFXP in Erie, Pennsylvania
- WGBO-DT in Joliet, Illinois
- WGBP-TV in Opelika, Alabama
- WPXW-TV in Manassas, Virginia
- WSMH in Flint, Michigan
- WUNI in Marlborough, Massachusetts
- WWIW-LD in Raleigh, North Carolina
- WXPX-TV in Brandenton, Florida

The following stations, which are no longer licensed, formerly operated on virtual channel 66:

- WNNB-CD in Beaver, Pennsylvania
- WNYJ-TV in West Milford, New Jersey
