= KGDC =

- Walla Walla, Washington; United States
- Frequency: 1320 kHz
- Branding: News/Talk Radio

Programming
- Format: News/Talk

Ownership
- Owner: Two Hearts Communications, LLC; (Two Hearts Communications, LLC)

Technical information
- Licensing authority: FCC
- Facility ID: 35124
- Class: B
- Power: 1000 watts day 66 watts night
- Transmitter coordinates: 46°01′25″N 118°21′17″W
- Translator: 92.9 K225CJ (Walla Walla)

Links
- Public license information: Public file; LMS
- Website: kgdcradio.com

KGDC (1320 AM) is a radio station based in Walla Walla, Washington, broadcasting on 1320 kHz in the AM radio spectrum. Two Hearts Communications, LLC, has been the licensee of KGDC since 2001.

KGDC broadcasts a news/talk format and is the sole source of Fox News for the Walla Walla, WA, and Milton-Freewater, OR, areas. Talk hosts include Bill Bennett, Laura Ingraham, Dennis Prager, Michael Medved and Hugh Hewitt.
