= WJRT-TV =

Television station in Flint, Michigan

- Flint–Saginaw–Bay City–Midland, Michigan; United States
- City: Flint, Michigan
- Channels: Digital: 12 (VHF); Virtual: 12
- Branding: ABC12; MeTV Mid-Michigan (12.2)

Programming
- Affiliations: 12.1: ABC; for others, see § Subchannels

Ownership
- Owner: Allen Media Group; (Flint TV License Company, LLC)

History
- First air date: October 12, 1958
- Former channel numbers: Analog: 12 (VHF, 1958–2009); Digital: 36 (UHF, 2001–2009)
- Call sign meaning: Derived from former sister radio station WJR plus Television

Technical information
- Licensing authority: FCC
- Facility ID: 21735
- ERP: 30 kW
- HAAT: 286 m (938 ft)
- Transmitter coordinates: 43°13′49″N 84°3′32″W

Links
- Public license information: Public file; LMS
- Website: www.abc12.com

WJRT-TV (channel 12) is a television station licensed to Flint, Michigan, United States, serving as the ABC affiliate for east central Michigan. Owned by Allen Media Group, the station maintains studios on Lapeer Road in Flint, with offices and a second newsroom for the Tri-Cities in Saginaw. Its transmitter is located on Burt Road in St. Charles Township, northeast of Chesaning.

== History ==
=== Goodwill Stations ===
In May 1952, Goodwill Stations, owner of WJR radio in Detroit, announced the intent of applying for four station licenses which would operate as a regional network: channel 50 in Detroit, channel 11 in Toledo, Ohio, channel 12 in Flint and channel 5 in Bay City. TV outlets would eventually appear on all four of these channels in these cities, but only one was actually founded by Goodwill Stations: WJRT-TV, in 1958. Goodwill won out over two other companies seeking to operate channel 12: the Trebit Corporation (which owned WFDF), and W. S. Butterfield Theatres, Inc. WPAG-TV, airing on Channel 20 in Ann Arbor, also considered moving to Channel 12, but Goodwill already held the construction permit for WJRT. WPAG-TV initially wanted to place its transmitter in Independence Township, Michigan; however, since Independence Township was located in Oakland County, part of the Detroit television market, Goodwill instead placed the tower in St. Charles Township in southwestern Saginaw County, where the transmitter remains today.

WJRT-TV went on the air on October 12, 1958, at 5 p.m. It has been an ABC network affiliate since its inception. As part of the winning bid for the license, the station had to produce several hours of original local programming each day for ten years. At the time the station had to fill 55 hours of programming outside of the network shows. This stipulation led to the creation of original shows, including Mr. Magic and Folkswingers.

Goodwill Stations took over the former WTAC-TV studios and offices at 2302 Lapeer Road in Flint, after that station folded in 1954; WJRT remains there today.

=== Various owners ===
Goodwill Stations merged with Capital Cities Broadcasting in 1964, but WJRT-TV was spun off to Poole Broadcasting (owned by John Poole, a former Capital Cities stockholder) on July 29, 1964, because the merged company was one VHF station over the Federal Communications Commission (FCC) ownership limit of the time. The station was the first Michigan television station outside of Detroit to go all-color in 1967 on Labor Day which saw the launch of its Bozo show. With the original license agreement for local shows expired in 1968, all but Bozo were replaced by 1972 with syndicated programs.

In 1978, WJRT along with the rest of Poole Broadcasting (which included WPRI-TV in Providence, Rhode Island, and WTEN in Albany, New York) were sold to Knight Ridder. In October 1988, the company placed its eight broadcast television stations up for sale to reduce debt and to pay a major purchase. As a result, the station was sold to SJL Broadcast Management in 1989.

During the 1970s, WJRT-TV became Mid-Michigan's highest-rated television station, helped by ABC's ratings improvements during the decade. During the late 1980s and into the 1990s, WJRT-TV was usually second to WNEM-TV.

=== ABC-owned station ===
In 1994, New World Communications signed an affiliation deal with Fox Broadcasting Company, resulting in most of New World's stations switching affiliations to Fox, including Phoenix's CBS affiliate, KSAZ-TV. CBS secured a replacement affiliate in that market via a larger deal with the Meredith Corporation, owner of NBC affiliate WNEM, that also saw WNEM switching from NBC to CBS. NBC was rumored to be courting SJL about either purchasing WJRT and WTVG, their existing affiliate in Toledo, Ohio, or securing a long-term affiliation deal for both stations. As a result, Capital Cities/ABC agreed to purchase both WJRT and WTVG for $155 million in October 1994, effectively preserving their affiliation in Flint and gaining a VHF affiliate in Toledo. Former CBS affiliate WEYI-TV took the NBC affiliation dropped by WNEM. Soon after ABC purchased WJRT, the station returned to the top of the Mid-Michigan ratings for prime time, where it remains today.

When ABC acquired WJRT in 1995, it was reunited with its namesake radio station, WJR. WJR's owner, Capital Cities, had acquired ABC in 1986. In 2002, WFDF (now a Detroit station), which unsuccessfully sought a channel 12 license in the 1950s, would also become a sister to WJRT-TV when ABC bought the station. However, this reunion was partially broken up, as ABC sold WJR, along with other ABC Radio properties, to Citadel Broadcasting in January 2006; they are now owned by Cumulus Media.

ABC12, the first in Mid-Michigan, started their digital broadcast on May 1, 2002, on channel 36. In June 2008, the station received a construction permit for post-transition digital facilities.

=== 2nd SJL ownership ===
On November 3, 2010, Broadcasting & Cable magazine announced that SJL Broadcasting, now owned by the principal owners of Lilly Broadcasting, made an agreement with Disney to buy back WJRT and WTVG, the two smallest stations in ABC's O&O portfolio. Both stations would retain their affiliations with ABC. SJL teamed up with a new private equity partner, Bain Capital, whose affiliated offshoot Sankaty Advisors provided the capital for the purchases (which amounted to $13.2 million on WJRT's end of the $30 million deal). The sale was completed on April 1, 2011.

=== Sales to Gray Television and Allen Media Group ===
On July 24, 2014, SJL announced that it would sell WJRT and WTVG again, this time to Gray Television, for $128 million—a value higher than that of their original sale to ABC. Gray also owns Lansing's NBC affiliate WILX-TV. The sale was completed on September 15 and funded mostly by loans.

On May 3, 2021, Gray announced it would acquire the Local Media stations of Meredith Corporation for $2.7 billion. As Meredith was the owner of WNEM-TV and both stations rank among the top four in terms of total viewers, Gray intended to keep WNEM and sell WJRT to a third party. On July 14, Gray announced it would sell WJRT to Allen Media Group, a subsidiary of Byron Allen's Entertainment Studios, which had also acquired several Quincy Media stations through Gray. The sale was completed on September 23, effectively separating it from WTVG after 30 years as sister stations.

On June 1, 2025, amid financial woes and rising debt, Allen Media Group announced that it would explore "strategic options" for the company, such as a sale of its television stations (including WJRT).

== Programming ==
As part of the winning bid for the license, the station had to produce original local programming several hours a day for 10 years. At the time the station had to fill 55 hours of programming outside of the network shows. With the original license agreement for local shows expired in 1968, all but Bozo were replaced by 1972 with syndicated programs. Many of the local children's series were franchised series like Bozo and Romper Room compared to WNEM's full original programs.

- Mr. Magic (1960–1967) was started on air with newly hired commercial writer Earl Frank Cady was asked to come up with a children's program. After taking some magic classes, the show was launched. The show was replaced by Bozo on the day the station went to full color on Labor Day 1967.
- Bozo's Big Top (1967–1979) local performed by Earl Frank Cady
- Colonel Gyro from Outer Space
- Romper Room with Miss Margie
- Theatre of Thrills (1961–67) a horror film anthology with host "Christopher Coffin" played by Farrell Reed Pasternak, a local advertising agency owner and voice-over announcer

Frank Deal, the station weather forecaster, hosted a few of the locally produced shows:

- Almanac early-morning information show
- TV Bingo
- Folkswingers, an entertainment program
- Rae Deane and Friends (1961–68) was co-hosted with Rae Deane Gerkowski with Deal serving as puppet master for puppets Montgomery Lion and Dilly Mahatmashmu.

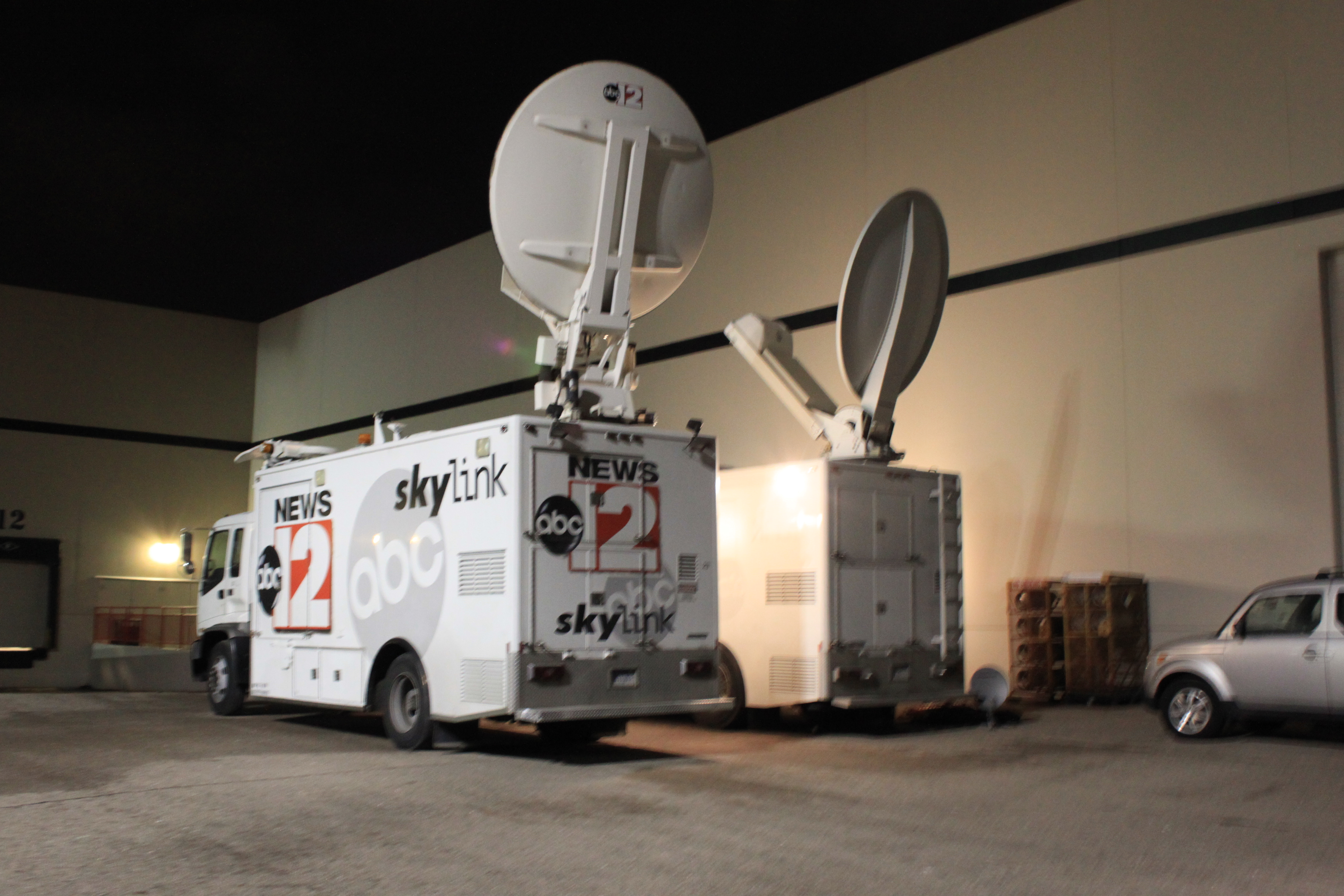
WJRT News Skylink trucks.

=== News operation ===
As of October 2024, WJRT presently broadcasts 37 hours of locally produced newscasts each week (with seven hours each weekday and one hour each on Saturdays and Sundays).

The station produces a regular slate of newscasts plus additional afternoon content during the week. With the cancellation of Who Wants to Be a Millionaire, the station expanded its noon newscast to an hour starting September 9, 2019, with consumer alerts, entertainment highlights, a featured "Pet of the Day" (a companion segment to 4 p.m. "Dog of the Day" but focusing on other pets) and "Worth it Wednesday" deals segment based on Good Morning America's "Steals and Deals" segment. Also in September, Gray TV stations including WJRT began carrying Full Court Press hosted by Greta Van Susteren.

WJRT's news director Jim Bleicher and General Manager Tom Bryson either retired or left the station after the sale was announced. Furthermore, on April 6, 2011, less than a week after SJL taking over control of WJRT, they terminated longtime weekend anchor Joel Feick and removed longtime weeknight anchor Bill Harris from the newsdesk. Harris later returned to WJRT on May 3, 2011, reporting from a homeland security training conference in Grand Rapids for the station's evening newscast. Feick was later hired by competitor WEYI-TV as weekday morning news anchor. On January 4, 2012, it was announced that Harris was also hired by WEYI-TV to anchor the 6 p.m. newscast, a position he began on January 30, 2012.

On October 8, 2012, a one-on-one interview with Republican vice presidential candidate Paul Ryan by WJRT's Terry Camp made national news when Ryan accused Camp of "stuffing words into people's mouths" after he asked questions about inner-city crime and gun laws, then later said Camp "embarrassed himself". MSNBC host Rachel Maddow aired the segment on her show the next day and defended Camp while attacking Ryan's answers. Fox News Channel host Brian Kilmeade took the opposite stance by defending Ryan and saying Camp asked "gotcha questions".

In September 2019, the station expanded its noon newscast and added a national syndication news show.

On January 17, 2025, Allen Media Group announced plans to cut local meteorologist/weather forecaster positions from its stations, including WJRT, and replace them with a "weather hub" produced by The Weather Channel, which AMG also owns.

== Technical information ==
=== Subchannels ===
The station's signal is multiplexed:

Subchannels of WJRT-TV
Subchannel	Res.	Short name	Programming
12.1	720p	WJRT-HD	ABC
12.2	480i	WJRT-D2	MeTV
12.3	480i	WJRT-D3	Catchy Comedy
12.4	480i	WJRT-D4	Start TV
12.5	480i	WJRT-D5	Heroes & Icons
12.6	480i	WJRT-D6	Bounce TV
12.7	480i	WJRT-D7	MeTV Toons

In 2004 along with the other ABC owned stations, WJRT launched ABC News Now on its digital subchannel. In 2005, the ABC O&Os launched AccuWeather Channel on their third subchannel.

ABC Owned Television Stations, including WJRT, launched the Live Well Network in high definition on the stations' sub-channels on April 27, 2009.

On October 31, 2013, WJRT added the local version of WeatherNation to its third digital subchannel, replacing AccuWeather Channel.

On October 17, 2014, Gray Television announced it was adding MeTV to WJRT on 12.2, replacing Live Well Network in December 2014. On August 30, 2019, two new channels were launched, carrying Start TV and Heroes and Icons.

WJRT-TV began carrying the Circle network upon its launch on January 1, 2020, replacing WeatherNation. The Circle network was discontinued at the start of 2024 and was replaced by TheGrio. After that channel ended terrestrial broadcasts in 2025, it was replaced by Catchy Comedy.

MeTV Toons was added to the lineup on channel 12.7 effective June 25, 2024.

=== Analog-to-digital conversion ===
WJRT-TV ended regular programming on its analog signal, over VHF channel 12, on June 12, 2009, the official date on which full-power television stations in the United States transitioned from analog to digital broadcasts under federal mandate. The station's digital signal relocated from its pre-transition UHF channel 36 to VHF channel 12.

After the return to VHF, viewers who had installed UHF receiving antennas during the transition period had the signal compromised. So on October 14, 2009, WJRT filed an application with the FCC to increase the power level from 18.2 kW to 30 kW. The increase was approved in May 2011.
