= Barrington Broadcasting =

American broadcast television corporation (2003–2013)

Barrington Broadcasting Group, LLC
- Company type: Private
- Industry: Mass media
- Genre: Television broadcasting
- Founded: May 2003; 23 years ago
- Founders: Keith Bland; Chris Cornelius; Mary Flodin; K. James Yager
- Defunct: November 25, 2013; 12 years ago
- Fate: Acquired by Sinclair
- Successor: Sinclair Broadcast Group
- Headquarters: Schaumburg, Illinois, USA
- Number of locations: Fifteen ranked television markets (U.S.)
- Key people: K. James Yager, CEO; Warren Spector, CFO
- Services: Broadcasting
- Parent: Pilot Group

Barrington Broadcasting Group, LLC was an American mass media and broadcasting company based in Schaumburg, Illinois. It owned television stations primarily in middle and small-sized media markets. Barrington owned or operated via duopoly twenty-four television stations, with the potential to reach about 3.4 percent of households in the U.S. It was owned by Pilot Group, a private equity firm.

== History ==
Barrington Broadcasting was established in May 2003 by a team of former executives from Benedek Broadcasting. Following Benedek's bankruptcy and subsequent divestiture of all television assets in 2002, K. James Yager, the former President, along with Senior Vice-Presidents Chris Cornelius, Keith Bland, and Mary Flodin, formed a company for medium and small market broadcasting.

The company began operations in January 2004 with its purchases of former Benedek stations WHOI-TV (Peoria, Illinois) and KHQA-TV (Hannibal, Missouri/Quincy, Illinois) along with WEYI-TV in Vienna Township, Michigan. Barrington grew slowly at first, adding five more stations between 2004 and early 2006. A major expansion took place on March 27, 2006, when Raycom Media agreed to sell twelve of its network-affiliated TV stations to Barrington for $262 million. The sale was completed on August 11. In recent years, Barrington had been at the forefront of integrating social media and the internet into their on-air content.

In late 2012, it was announced that Pilot Group had put Barrington up for sale and that both Nexstar Broadcasting Group and Sinclair Broadcast Group were in final talks to acquire the full regiment of stations. On February 28, 2013, Barrington announced that it would sell its stations to Sinclair. The sale was granted FCC approval on November 18. The transaction was formally consummated on November 25.

== Former stations ==
- Stations are arranged in alphabetical order by state and city of license.

Stations owned by Barrington Broadcasting
| Media market | State | Station | Purchased | Sold | Notes |
|---|---|---|---|---|---|
| Colorado Springs–Pueblo | Colorado | KXRM-TV | 2006 | 2013 | |
| Colorado Springs–Pueblo | Colorado | KXTU-LD | 2006 | 2013 | |
| Albany | Georgia | WFXL | 2006 | 2013 | |
| Peoria–Bloomington | Illinois | WHOI | 2004 | 2013 | |
| Quincy | Illinois | KHQA-TV | 2004 | 2013 | |
| Marquette | Michigan | WLUC-TV | 2006 | 2013 | |
| Saginaw–Bay City–Flint | Michigan | WEYI-TV | 2004 | 2013 | |
| Saginaw–Bay City–Flint | Michigan | WBSF | 2004 | 2013 | |
| Sault Ste. Marie, MI | Michigan | WGTQ | 2009 | 2013 | (Note: Satellite of WGTU.) (Note: Owned by a third party and operated by Barrington.) |
| Sault Ste. Marie, MI | Michigan | WTOM-TV | 2006 | 2013 | (Note: Satellite of WPBN.) |
| Traverse City | Michigan | WGTU | 2009 | 2013 | |
| Traverse City | Michigan | WPBN-TV | 2006 | 2013 | |
| Columbia–Jefferson City | Missouri | KRCG | 2005 | 2013 | |
| Kirksville | Missouri | KTVO | 2006 | 2013 | |
| Clovis | New Mexico | KVIH-TV | 2005 | 2013 | (Note: Satellite of KVII.) |
| Syracuse | New York | WSTM-TV | 2006 | 2013 | |
| Syracuse | New York | WTVH | 2009 | 2013 | |
| Syracuse | New York | WSTQ-LP | 2006 | 2013 | |
| Toledo | Ohio | WNWO-TV | 2006 | 2013 | |
| Columbia | South Carolina | WACH | 2006 | 2013 | |
| Florence–Myrtle Beach | South Carolina | WPDE-TV | 2005 | 2013 | |
| Florence–Myrtle Beach | South Carolina | WWMB | 2005 | 2013 | |
| Amarillo | Texas | KVII-TV | 2005 | 2013 | |
| Harlingen–McAllen–Brownsville | Texas | KGBT-TV | 2006 | 2013 | |
