= WJMK (AM) =

Oldies radio station in Bridgeport–Saginaw, Michigan

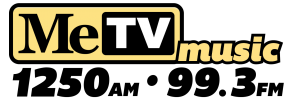
- Bridgeport, Michigan; United States
- Broadcast area: Saginaw-Bay City-Midland
- Frequency: 1250 kHz
- Branding: MeTV Music

Programming
- Format: Oldies
- Affiliations: MeTV FM

Ownership
- Owner: Northern States Broadcasting

History
- First air date: November 26, 1956
- Former call signs: WWBC (11/26/56-1962); WXOX (1962-11/1/83); WTCX (11/1/83-2/13/84); WXOX (2/13/84-8/23/96); WJZZ (8/23/96-2/1/97); WKNX (2/1/97-8/2/04); WNEM (8/2/04-6/18/13); WHHQ (6/18/13-4/4/2018)

Technical information
- Licensing authority: FCC
- Facility ID: 4600
- Class: D
- Power: 5,000 watts (Daytime); 1,100 watts (Nighttime)
- Transmitter coordinates: 43°20′31″N 83°53′57″W
- Translator: 99.3 W257EO (Bridgeport)

Links
- Public license information: Public file; LMS
- Webcast: Listen Live
- Website: 1250wjmk.com

WJMK (1250 AM) is a radio station broadcasting an oldies format, serving the Saginaw/Bay City, Michigan market from its transmitter in Bridgeport, its city of license. WJMK is owned by Northern States Broadcasting. WJMK broadcasts with a power of 5,000 watts daytime, 1,100 watts at night, directed towards the north.

== History ==
=== As WKNX (1210 AM) ===
WJMK's history can be traced back as early as April 17, 1947, when the station first signed on the air at 1210 AM as WKNX, owned by Lake Huron Broadcasting. The station was like many of its day, programming a full-service format of music, news, and talk. For many years, it was also a leading Top 40 hit music station in Saginaw, competing with WSAM (1400 AM) and Flint's WTAC (600 AM, now WSNL).

Among the station's history was the acquisition of a sister television station in the 1950s, and was also the radio home of 1950s country music artist "Little" Jimmy Dickens. WKNX's resident "legend" would take form of University of Cincinnati graduate Robert Dyer, who joined the station in 1950 and remained a part of its staff for more than half a century.

In 1977, Lake Huron Broadcasting acquired an FM station in the Tampa Bay region of Florida -- WQYK-FM, a station that also carried a country format.

=== Move to Frankenmuth ===
The following year, in 1978, WKNX underwent a major change when it was purchased by Radiocom Limited, a company headed by Robert Dana McVay. WKNX's city of license was immediately changed to Frankenmuth, and the station's studios and offices were moved to 306 West Genesee Avenue in Frankenmuth, where it was later joined by a Tuscola-licensed sister FM station, WGMZ-FM (now WWBN), which programmed beautiful music. (The WGMZ calls and format moved from 107.9 FM, which became WCRZ "Cars 108" in 1984.) By the early 1990s, WKNX-AM was programming big band music and adult standards.

Radiocom owned WKNX and leased out WGMZ (which would later become country-formatted WKMF and move its operations to Flint) until 1994, when WKNX was purchased by Detroit-based Bell Broadcasting Company in a frequency swap involving another AM station in Bay City (1250 WXOX), which had been silent since the early 1990s.

=== Sale to Bell Broadcasting and frequency swap ===
Bell Broadcasting owned WCHB, an AM station licensed to Taylor, which operated at a daytime signal of 25,000 watts and a nighttime signal of 1,000 watts. WCHB was a talk station targeted to an African-American audience. The company's intent was to acquire WKNX's frequency of 1210 and silence it in order to provide WCHB with a 50,000-watt daytime signal.

WKNX would then acquire the license of WXOX, which had first signed on in 1956 as a station first licensed to Essexville. Over time, the 1,000-watt station, operating at 1250 kHz, began broadcasting from Bay City with its co-owned Pinconning-licensed FM sister at 100.9. By the end of the 1980s, both stations had separated ownership, ran into financial trouble and fell silent. 100.9 was spun off to a new owner in 1991, but WXOX remained silent.

Bell would then have WKNX assume WXOX's 1250 AM frequency and its abandoned three-tower directional transmitter site in Bridgeport. In January 1997, WKNX signed on at 1250 AM, and 1210 AM was placed at WXOX and assigned the new call letters WJZZ, though it did not sign back on from Frankenmuth or the surrounding area. (The former WXOX calls have since been recycled for a Cleveland low-powered TV station, now WTCL-LD.)

The FCC then granted WJZZ a request to change its city of license to Kingsley, a village near Traverse City, located on the other side of Michigan. The move allowed WJZZ to increase its power from 10,000 to 50,000 watts, as it was no longer in the path of WCHB. WJZZ was later sold and later became WLDR (now WJNL).

=== Sale to Frankenmuth Broadcasting ===
WKNX continued its format of middle-of-the-road music under the moniker "Memories 1250". Six months after the frequency change, WKNX was sold by Bell Broadcasting to Frankenmuth Broadcasting, a company owned by WKNX announcer John Blehm and his wife Kathy, who were committed to keeping the station in Frankenmuth. Four years later, the music became more rock-and-roll oldies-based and also added religious-based talk programming during the daytime hours.

WKNX was granted permission to broadcast at night two years later with a power output of 129 watts, directional. Concurrent with the application, WKNX moved its studio and office operations from Frankenmuth to its transmitter facility at 2850 Gabel Road in Bridgeport Township. In January 2004, Frankenmuth Broadcasting applied for a power increase from 1,000 to 5,000 watts. Two months later, Frankenmuth Broadcasting entered into an agreement to sell WKNX to the Meredith Corporation for $1.1 million.

=== WNEM ===
In the summer of 2004, the parent company of WNEM-TV, Meredith Corporation, purchased WKNX. Soon after the purchase, the call sign was changed to "WNEM" and shifted its studios to the television studio building in downtown Saginaw at 107 North Franklin Street. Unlike its TV counterpart, however, the AM station does not serve Flint or areas south of Saginaw County, due to the directional antenna array beamed towards the north. The station was also simulcasted via the Internet on WNEM's website, except for sports coverage. In a coincidental situation, WNEM-TV rival WEYI-TV was founded as WKNX-TV, a sister station to WKNX radio; it was sold off in 1972. This also once again gave WNEM-TV a radio sister, which they lost in 1969 when Gerity Broadcasting, which owned WNEM-FM (now WIOG), sold WNEM-TV to Meredith.

The FCC granted WNEM permission in January 2006 to operate at the new power levels with the addition of a fourth tower in its directional antenna pattern. At one point programmed as an all-news station, WNEM's primary programming later consisted of simulcasts of WNEM-TV's newscasts, syndicated talk shows (including Michael Patrick Shiels in the Morning, The Neal Boortz Show, and The Dave Ramsey Show), and syndicated regional sports and additional programming. WNEM picked up Detroit Red Wings ice hockey coverage in late 2005, making it mid-Michigan's only source of NHL hockey. Following the station's sale and format change, coverage of Red Wings games moved to WSGW.

The station was not profitable, as it had a poor signal in which it would drop from a daytime high of about 5,000 to 1,000 watts at night. Meredith looked for a buyer to no avail, thus looking to donate the station instead. By May 1, 2013, with Meredith giving up ownership, the station went dark.

=== WHHQ ===
On May 30, 2013, Meredith had donated WNEM radio's license, equipment, tower and land to Ave Maria Communications, which currently brokers all its Catholic-related programming on WMAX (1440 AM) in Bay City. The station changed its call sign to WHHQ on June 18, 2013. The two stations were to be complementary programmed. WHHQ simulcasted WMAX's programming, despite its considerable overlap of the parent station's coverage area. Ave Maria Radio later moved the studios to A-M Church Supply at 3535 Bay Road in Saginaw Township.

=== WJMK ===
On April 4, 2018, WHHQ was sold for $175,000 to Northern States Broadcasting Corporation. The station changed call letters to WJMK (last used by 104.3 FM in Chicago) on April 3, 2018, and picked up the MeTV FM easy oldies format originating on WRME-LP (87.7 FM) in Chicago run by Weigel Broadcasting. The station is simulcasted on FM translator station W257EO at 99.3 MHz, which can be picked up in the immediate Saginaw area.
