= WNEM-TV =

Television station in Bay City, Michigan

- Bay City–Saginaw–Midland–Flint, Michigan; United States
- City: Bay City, Michigan
- Channels: Digital: 30 (UHF); Virtual: 5
- Branding: 5.1: WNEM-TV5; 5.2: WNEM-TV5 Plus

Programming
- Affiliations: 5.1: CBS; 5.2: Independent with MyNetworkTV; for others, see § Subchannels

Ownership
- Owner: Gray Media; (Gray Television Licensee, LLC)

History
- First air date: February 16, 1954
- Former channel numbers: Analog: 5 (VHF, 1954–2009); Digital: 22 (UHF, 2000–2020)
- Former affiliations: NBC (1954–1995); DuMont (secondary, 1954–1956); ABC (secondary, 1954–1958); The WB (secondary, 1995–1999); UPN (secondary, 1995–2006)
- Call sign meaning: Northeastern Michigan Corporation

Technical information
- Licensing authority: FCC
- Facility ID: 41221
- ERP: 585 kW
- HAAT: 303 m (994 ft)
- Transmitter coordinates: 43°28′14″N 83°50′36″W

Links
- Public license information: Public file; LMS
- Website: Official website

WNEM-TV (channel 5) is a television station licensed to Bay City, Michigan, United States, serving east central Michigan as an affiliate of CBS and MyNetworkTV. Owned by Gray Media, the station maintains studios on North Franklin Street in downtown Saginaw, with a second newsroom in downtown Flint. Its transmitter is located on Becker Road in Robin Glen-Indiantown, in Buena Vista Township, east of Saginaw.

== History ==
=== NBC affiliate ===
On the week before May 5, 1952, Goodwill Stations, owner of WJR radio in Detroit, announced the intent of applying for four station licenses which would operate as a regional network—UHF channel 50 in Detroit, channel 11 in Toledo, Ohio, channel 12 in Flint and channel 5 in Bay City. WNEM-TV was founded by the Northeastern Michigan Corporation, hence the call letters, on February 16, 1954, as an NBC affiliate. Originally, its main studios were located on rented space at Bishop International Airport in Flint with auxiliary studios in its city of license, Bay City. In the 1960s, it moved its main studios to the transmitter site in Indiantown, after flirting with the idea of co-locating the television station on the WSAM tower in Saginaw. During its first four years, WNEM-TV had a secondary affiliation with ABC, sharing programming from that network with WKNX-TV (channel 57, now WEYI-TV channel 25) until 1958 when WJRT-TV signed-on and took that affiliation. WNEM-TV also aired programming from DuMont until that network dissolved in August 1956.

Professional violinist James Gerity's Gerity Broadcasting bought the station in 1961 and sold it to the Meredith Corporation in 1969. The transition to Meredith was first announced in 1968, and was at that time, the first and only NBC affiliate owned by the company (a distinction later held by WSMV, until it was transferred to Gray). In the mid-1980s, the station moved its primary studios to their current location in downtown Saginaw. The Becker Road studios would later be used for the Buena Vista campus of Delta College, though the complex still houses WNEM-TV's transmitter.

=== CBS affiliate ===
On January 16, 1995, WNEM-TV and WEYI swapped networks, and WNEM-TV became a CBS affiliate (announced June 30, 1994). The move came as part of the larger U.S. network affiliation switch that saw WNEM's sister station in Phoenix, KPHO-TV, take the CBS affiliation in that city after KSAZ-TV dropped the network in favor of Fox.

The Meredith-era "TV5" logo used from 1980 to 1996. In the mid–1980s, the colored version of the logo was placed on a red triangle.

My5 subchannel logo based on MyNetworkTV's logo, used from May 2008 to July 30, 2018.

The day that WNEM-TV became a CBS affiliate, it also took on secondary affiliations with both UPN and The WB and aired programming from the two networks late at night. The station relinquished the secondary WB affiliation in October 1999 to WEYI. It dropped CBS' daytime soap opera Guiding Light in 1996 due to low ratings, which made it one of two CBS stations in the nation that did not carry the program for what would turn out to be its final 13 years (the other was KOVR in Sacramento, California). However, by 2007 the show was aired instead on My5 at 10 a.m., and stayed there for the rest of its run. WNEM now clears the entire CBS daytime lineup on its primary channel, having moved Guiding Light's replacement Let's Make a Deal over from My5 in 2012. It currently airs at 10 a.m.

As of April 1, 2011, Comcast cable subscribers in Holly, Michigan, and surrounding areas had WNEM-TV replaced with Detroit's WWJ-TV as the main CBS network affiliate. My5 was also replaced with WMYD as the main MyNetworkTV affiliate. While Holly is much closer to Flint than Detroit (15 miles [24 km] compared to 45 miles [72 km]), it is in the far northern portion of Oakland County, which is technically part of the Detroit television market.

On May 3, 2021, Gray Television announced it would acquire Meredith's Local Media stations for $2.7 billion. At the time, Gray owned WJRT-TV and as both stations rank among the top four in terms of total viewers, it intended to keep WNEM and sell WJRT to a third party. On July 14, Gray announced it would sell WJRT to Allen Media Group, a subsidiary of Byron Allen's Entertainment Studios, which was in the process of also acquiring several Quincy Media stations through Gray until August 2, 2021. The acquisition was completed on December 1, a couple months after Gray divested WJRT.

== Programming ==
Little to no records are held regarding the station's early programming. The few that were remembered are Chester the Clown, Hoss 'n' Stuff, Mr. Hot Dog, "Captain Muddy" hosting Popeye cartoons, Adventure Patrol and the "Jumping Cowboy."

At launch, the station hired Chet Rogoza as an announcer and drafted as the Chester the Clown host. Chester only being a puppet controlled by Rogoza. Harold Stone joined the show as the puppet master for Mr. Shaakestail, Bard disciple dog late in the shows run, which ended in the early 1960s.

Hoss 'n' Stuff featured a puppet horse played by Jim Adams and the mailman Stuff played by Chuck Waters. Stuff would visit Hoss at the fence for a comedic interchange with Stuff being the straight man.

Mr. Hot Dog originated as an ad featuring Jim Peyton as the logo character of the restaurant chain of the same name. Quickly, the character had its own Saturday morning program with the added puppet character of Daddy Cool with a long wiener-shaped nose.

From 1958 to 1968, Chuck Waters as "Captain Muddy" of the S.S. Mudhole hosted the Popeye cartoons. Adventure Patrol was hosted by station manager Tom Mathews with little else known about the show. A transfer from the Cadillac–Traverse City market, the station had a Western show featuring Kenny Roberts, the "Jumping Cowboy."

=== Sports ===
WNEM-TV televises regional and national sports from CBS Sports. Local sports include games of the Michigan Wolverines and Michigan State Spartans via College Basketball on CBS and since 2024, College Football on CBS Sports. The station also carries Detroit Lions games selected for the NFL on CBS, traditionally home contests against AFC opponents but since the introduction of crossflexing can include Lions road games or a home game with an NFC opponent. The station is an affiliate of the Detroit Lions Television Network which airs preseason games. Channel 5 has also televised three home games of the local Ontario Hockey League team the Saginaw Spirit. By 2007, WNEM picked up Detroit Pistons games outside of the network agreements for My5 TV. In February 2007, WNEM picked up 17 Detroit Tigers games through Fox Sports Detroit's Tigers regional TV network primarily for My5 TV.

In 2025, WNEM announced a 15-game broadcast agreement with the Great Lakes Loons, the High-A affiliate of the Los Angeles Dodgers. Games air on both WNEM and WNEM+.

=== News operation ===
As of December 2021, WNEM presently broadcasts 35 1/2 hours of locally produced newscasts each week (with six hours each weekday, three hours on Saturdays, and 2 1/2 hours on Sundays), and produces an additional 10 hours of newscasts for its MyNetworkTV subchannel (with two hours each weekday).

In addition to its main facilities, the station operates a Genesee County Bureau at the Wade Trim Building on Saginaw Street in Downtown Flint. This had been located in Mundy Township's Gateway Center until October 2008. WNEM-TV operates their own weather radar, known as "First Warn 5 Pinpoint Doppler Radar", on the eastern side of MBS International Airport which is also streamed live on its website.

WNEM broadcasts news at 4:30, 5, 6 and 9 a.m., noon, 5, 5:30, 6 and 11 p.m. On weekends, they broadcast a morning show at 8 a.m. Saturday and a two-hour show at 7 a.m. on Sunday. Weekend evenings includes local news in the 6 p.m. hour and an 11 p.m. broadcast. While on WNEM-TV 5 Plus, its news department has an hour-long news at 10 p.m. every day of the week plus a 7 p.m. half-hour on weeknights.

WNEM-TV produced news segments for then-sister radio station WNEM (1250 AM); this ended after Meredith donated the station to Ave Maria Communications, which adopted a Catholic radio format. WSGW 790 AM in Saginaw now rebroadcasts the 6 p.m. news. WNEM-TV 5 Plus previously rebroadcast the main channel's weeknight 6 o'clock newscast at 7, but this has since been replaced by a live newscast at 7.

In 2006, WNEM-TV entered into a news share agreement with Fox affiliate WSMH for their existing nightly prime time broadcast at 10 on that station. This came about after that station's owner, the Sinclair Broadcast Group, shut down its News Central operation as well as WSMH's news department. Originally entitled TV 5 News at 10 on Fox 66, the WNEM-TV-produced program recently added new graphics and was renamed Fox 66 News at 10. On Monday nights during the newscast, the "Fugitive Files" segment aired. On April 27, 2015, WSMH dropped WNEM's hour-long 10 p.m. news from their primary channel in favor of a new 10 p.m. show produced by the now Sinclair-managed WEYI, while WNEM moved that program to its WNEM-TV 5 Plus subchannel.

In August 2009, the station began carrying obituaries following its weekday morning, noon and 6 p.m. shows. This service began after local major newspapers in the region including The Bay City Times, The Saginaw News, and The Flint Journal reduced publication to three times a week in June 2009. At first, a free service when it was launched, WNEM-TV began charging $100 per obituary in September 2009. As of October 19, 2009, over 700 obituaries appeared on the channel and its website, obitmichigan.com. WNEM-TV became the second television in both Michigan and the United States, after WJBK, to air obituaries on a daily basis.

On November 21, 2011, WNEM-TV aired allegations of sexual abuse against U.S. Representative Dale Kildee that were criticized as politically motivated and a breach of journalistic ethics. An attorney for the station said that the broadcast was protected as it involved a public official and that no actual malice was intended.

==== Notable former on-air staff ====
- Pat Harvey – now at KCBS/KCAL

== Technical information ==
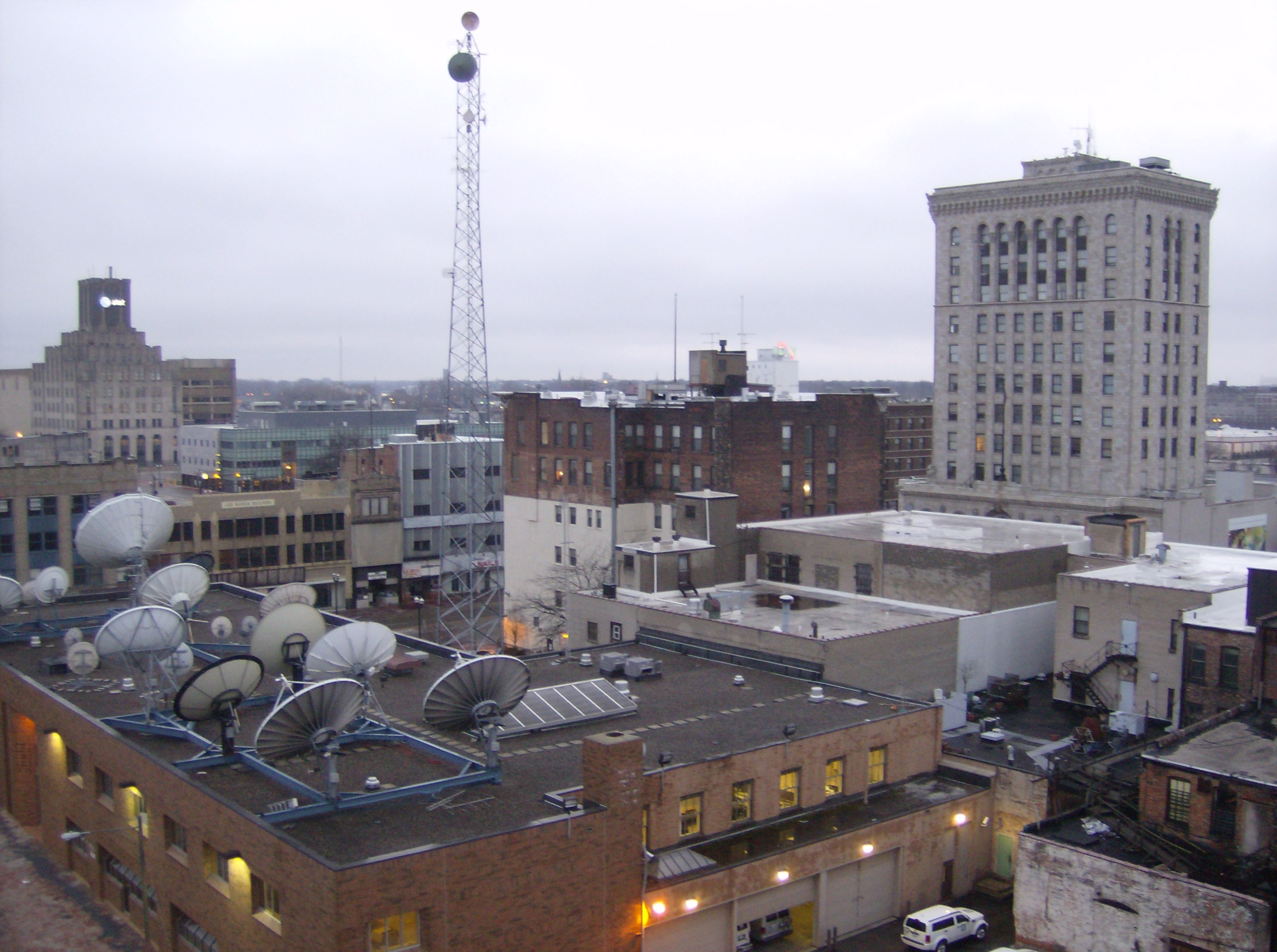
Saginaw skyline as seen from the Bearinger Building with WNEM-TV's studios in the foreground.

=== Subchannels ===
The station's signal is multiplexed:

Subchannels of WNEM-TV
Subchannel	Res.	Short name	Programming
5.1	1080i	WNEM-HD	CBS
5.2	720p	WNEM-D2	Independent with MyNetworkTV
5.3	480i	WNEM-D3	Cozi TV
5.4	480i	WNEM-D4	Ion
5.5	480i	WNEM-D5	Court TV
5.6	480i	WNEM-D6	365BLK

Around September 2006, WNEM launched a cable channel carrying MyNetworkTV (branded as "My 5") along with broadcasts of Detroit Pistons games. It would later be added to its DT2 subchannel. WNEM-TV changed its branding to "WNEM-TV5 Plus" on July 30, 2018.

In March 2015, WNEM launched a third subchannel carrying Cozi TV. A fourth subchannel carrying Ion Television, was launched in April 2017.

=== Analog-to-digital conversion ===
WNEM-TV ended regular programming on its analog signal, over VHF channel 5, on June 12, 2009, the official date on which full-power television stations in the United States transitioned from analog to digital broadcasts under federal mandate. The station's digital signal remained on its pre-transition UHF channel 22, using virtual channel 5. WNEM-TV remained on-the-air for a short period afterward with a nightlight slide with phone numbers and information about the switch.
