= List of Michigan State University people =

University

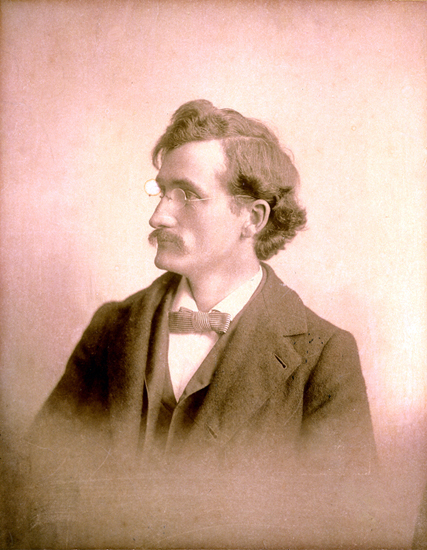
Liberty Hyde Bailey, Class of 1882

Michigan State University alumni number around 634,300 worldwide. Famous Spartans include NBA star Earvin "Magic" Johnson; MLB stars Kirk Gibson, Steve Garvey, Robin Roberts; NFL stars Brad Van Pelt, Bubba Smith, Herb Adderley and Joe DeLamielleure; actors James Caan and Robert Urich; Evil Dead trilogy director Sam Raimi; LGBT rights activist and internet personality Tyler Oakley; former Michigan governors James Blanchard, Fred M. Warner, and John Engler; former U.S. Senators Debbie Stabenow and Spencer Abraham; and billionaires Eli Broad, Reinhold Schmieding, Drayton McLane, Jr., Harley Hotchkiss, Thomas H. Bailey, Tom Gores, Andrew Beal and Dan Gilbert.

Michigan State's faculty and academic staff number around 4,500 researchers. Throughout the years, notable researchers have included William J. Beal, who developed hybrid corn; psychologist Erich Fromm; G. Malcolm Trout, who invented the process for the homogenization of milk; and Barnett Rosenberg, the discoverer of cancer-fighting drug cisplatin.

In addition to faculty, Michigan State has around 6,000 administrative and non-academic staff. This includes the university's governing board, the board of trustees. Elected by statewide referendum every two years, trustees have eight-year terms, with two of the eight elected every other year. As of 2007, the board is made up of three Republicans and five Democrats, and has a 4:4 gender balance.

Other notable staff members include President Kevin M. Guskiewicz, Athletic Director J Batt, men's basketball coach Tom Izzo, ice hockey coach Adam Nightingale, and football coach Pat Fitzgerald.

Table of contents

Notable alumni:

Academia: Education • Medicine • Science • Social science
Arts & media: Cinema • Journalism • Literature • Music • Television & radio • Visual arts
Business: Consumer goods • Finance • Industry
Politics & government: Activism • Diplomacy • Law • Public office
Sports & athletics: Baseball • Basketball • Football • Ice hockey • Running • Soccer • Olympians • MMA

Faculty & administration:

Notable faculty: Arts & humanities • Science • Social science
Current administration: Board of trustees • Head coaches
Former administration: Former presidents

Notes External links

== Notable alumni ==
=== Academia ===
==== Administration ====
Name	Degree	Year	Comments	Reference
David Kpakpoe Acquaye	B.S.	1952	professor, first head of the Soil Science, dean of agriculture, University of Ghana	
Debra D. Austin	B.A.		former chancellor, State University System of Florida	
Jacquelynn Baas	B.A.	1971	curator, cultural historian, writer, and director emeritus, UC Berkeley Art Museum and Pacific Film Archive	
Hugh P. Baker	B.S.	1901	president, University of Massachusetts Amherst; dean, New York State College of Forestry at Syracuse University	
Sian Beilock	Ph.D.	2003	president, Dartmouth College	
Warren W. Brandt	B.S.	1944	first president, Virginia Commonwealth University	
Frank A Buckless	B.A.	1981	dean, Poole College of Management, NC State	
Kenyon Butterfield	B.S.	1891	president, University of Rhode Island, UMass, and Michigan State University, appointed to the Country Life Commission by President Theodore Roosevelt	
Antoinette Candia-Bailey	M.A.	2001	vice president for student affairs at Lincoln University, 2023	
Oscar Clute	B.S.	1862	president, Michigan State, Florida Agricultural College (predecessor to University of Florida), ordained minister	
Richard A. Cosier	B.A.	1969	dean emeritus, Krannert School of Management, Purdue	
William H. Cunningham	B.B.A., M.B.A.	1966, 1967	former chancellor, University of Texas System	
Paul D'Anieri	B.A.	1986	vice president and provost, University of California, Riverside	
Grover C. Dillman	B.S.	1913	president, Michigan Tech University, 1935–1956	
Jeffrey Docking	B.A.	1983	president, Adrian College	
Kristie L. Ebi	B.S.	1972	founder, former director of the Center for Health and the Global Environment, University of Washington School of Public Health	
Glenn Goerke	Ph.D.	1962	former president/chancellor, University of Houston, University of Houston–Clear Lake, University of Houston–Victoria, and Indiana University East	
Lloyd Vincent Hackley	B.A.		former chancellor, Fayetteville State University	
Wendy Hensel	B.A.	1992	president, University of Hawaiʻi	
Stanley O. Ikenberry	M.A., Ph.D.	1957, 1960	former president (twice), University of Illinois	
Charles L. Ingersoll	B.S.		second president (1882–91), Colorado State University, credited with broadening and liberalizing the school's formerly narrow, vocational curriculum	
Anne Khademian	B.A. M.P.A.		political scientist, executive director of the Universities at Shady Grove, the University System of Maryland	
Charles Kiesler	B.A.	1958	former chancellor, University of Missouri	
William Edward Lavery	B.A.	1953	former president, Virginia Tech	
Jay Robert McColl	B.S.	1890	dean of engineering, University of Detroit	
Charles McKenny	B.S.	1881	former president, Central Michigan University, University of Wisconsin–Milwaukee and Eastern Michigan University	
William H. Sewell	B.A., M.A.	1933, 1934	former chancellor, University of Wisconsin–Madison	
Bernard Sliger	B.A., M.A., Ph.D.	1949, 1950. 1955	economist, former president, Florida State University	
James D. Spaniolo	B.A.	1968	former president, University of Texas at Arlington	
Teresa A. Sullivan	B.A.	1970	former president, University of Virginia	
Dwight B. Waldo	attended	1881–82	first president, Western Michigan University	
Kim A. Wilcox	B.S.	1976	chancellor, University of California, Riverside, former Michigan State University provost	
Marcellette G. Williams	B.A. M.A. Ph.D.	1968	former chancellor, first woman, of the University of Massachusetts	

==== Biology ====
Name	Degree	Year	Comments	Reference
Edgar Anderson	B.S.	1918	botanical geneticist	
Liberty Hyde Bailey	B.S.	1882	botanist, horticulturist, the "father of modern horticulture", author, philosopher	
Charles Fuller Baker	B.S.	1892	professor of Biology, Botany; college dean	
Frank Benton	B.S.	1879	entomologist educator, researcher, author, beekeeping innovator	
Charles E. Bessey	B.S.	1869	pioneer 19th-century botany educator; former president, American Association for the Advancement of Science	
Robert L. Carroll	B.S.	1959	vertebrate paleontologist, former director of Redpath Museum, McGill University	
William James Clench	B.S.	1921	former curator of the Mollusk Collection, Harvard Museum of Comparative Zoology	
Leon Jacob Cole	attended	1890s	geneticist and ornithologist, nicknamed the "father of American bird banding"	
Albert John Cook	B.S.	1862	zoology, entomology educator; chairman, California State Commission of Horticulture	
Larry Dalton	B.S.	1965	chemist best known for polymeric nonlinear electro-optics; recipient of Alfred P. Sloan Fellowship and NIH Research Career Development Award	
Arnold L. Demain	B.S. M.S.	1949 1950	former professor of microbiology, MIT, founder and head of the Department of Fermentation Microbiology, Merck & Co, world-leading industrial microbiologist	
Lyster H. Dewey	B.S.	1888	botanist, expert at USDA researching various fibre plants, most notably hemp (cannabis)	
C. Kurt Dewhurst	B.A.	1970	curator and folklorist, director emeritus of the Michigan State University Museum, past president, American Folklore Society	
Michael Donoghue	B.A.	1976	vice president, Evelyn Hutchinson Professor Ecology and Evolutionary Biology, Yale; former director of the university's Peabody Museum of Natural History; elected to U.S. National Academy of Sciences in 2005	
Mary K. Firestone	B.S M.S. Ph.D.		member, National Academy of Sciences, professor of soil microbiology in the Department of Environmental Studies, Policy, and Management, UC Berkeley	
Charles Christian Georgeson	B.S.	1877	founding director of Alaska Agricultural Experiment Station, namesake of Georgeson Botanical Garden at University of Alaska	
Alfred Gurdon Gulley	B.S.	1868	University of Connecticut revered horticulture professor; the university administration building bears his name	
Byron Halsted	B.S.	1871	botany educator, former president of the Botanical Society of America	
Ulysses P. Hedrick	B.S.	1893	botanist, horticulturalist	
Perry G. Holden	M.S.	1895	first professor of Agronomy in the US (1896)	
Patricia Hunt	B.A.	1977	Meyer Distinguished Professor in the School of Molecular Bioscience, Washington State University	
Walter Stephen Judd	B.S. M.S.	1973 1974	botanist and taxonomist, distinguished professor in the Department of Botany, University of Florida	
Ezra J. Kraus	B.S.	1907	former chair of Botany Department, University of Chicago	
Minakata Kumagusu	did not graduate		naturalist, known for study of slime molds in early 20th-century Japan	
Amy K. LeBlanc	D.V.M.	1999	veterinary oncologist and biologist, director of the Comparative Oncology Program at the National Cancer Institute	
Henry J. Oosting	M.S.	1927	ecologist at Duke University	
John J. Pipoly III	B.S.	1978	botanist	
Thomas D. Sharkey	B.S. Ph.D.	1974 1980	distinguished professor, biochemistry and microbiology, Michigan State University	
James W. Toumey	B.S.	1889	botanist, co-founder, early dean of Yale School of Forestry; namesake of the cactus genus Toumeya and New Hampshire's Yale-Toumey Forest	
Samuel Mills Tracy	B.S., M.S.	1868, 1871	botany educator; donator and founder of Tracy Herbarium at Texas A&M	
Truman G. Yuncker	B.S.	1915	bacteriologist, botanist; chair of Botany Department, DePauw University; appointed curator of DePauw Herbarium, later named the T.G. Yuncker Herbarium	

==== Business ====
Name	Degree	Year	Comments	Reference
Deborah A. Cobb-Clark	B.A.	1983	Australian economist, professor, University of Sydney	
Scott DeRue	Ph.D.		former dean of the Ross School of Business at the University of Michigan	
Connel Fullenkamp	B.A.	1987	economics professor at Duke University, financial trainer of US banks and corporations for the International Monetary Fund	
John Thomas Mentzer	M.B.A, Ph.D.		Chancellor's Professor and Vivienne R. Bruce Chair of Excellence in Business, University of Tennessee	
Sue Schurman	B.S. M.A.	1969 1977	distinguished professor at Rutgers School of Management and Labor Relations, former dean (2011–2015)	

==== Education ====
Name	Degree	Year	Comments	Reference
William Chandler Bagley	B.S.	1895	educator, pedagogy reformer championing Essentialism (as opposed to the Progressivism championed by John Dewey); founder, School and Society; editor-in-chief, Journal of the National Education Association, 1920–25	
Christine L. Borgman	B.A.	1973	Presidential Chair in Information Studies, Graduate School of Education and Information Studies, UCLA	
Catherine Corrigan	B.S.	1995	meteorite curator at the Smithsonian	
Eugene Davenport	B.S., M.S.	1878, 1884	agriculture educator; invited in 1891 by the government of Brazil to duplicate Michigan State with "Little Lansings"; dean of University of Illinois, College of Agriculture	
Eduard C. Lindeman	B.A.	1911	pioneer and champion of adult education	
Myrtle Craig Mowbray	B.S.	1907	first African-American woman to graduate from MSU; professor at historically black colleges and universities in Kansas and Missouri	
Roy Pea	B.A.	1974	education scholar, Rhodes Scholar	
Ione Genevieve Shadduck	M.A., PhD		educator, women's rights activist, and attorney	
Marta Tienda	B.A.	1972	director, Graduate Studies; former director, Office of Population Research, Princeton University; TIAA trustee since 2005	
Boyce Courtney Williams	M.A., Ph.D.		vice president of the NCATE	

==== Engineering ====
Name	Degree	Year	Comments	Reference
Bruce Ableson	B.A.	1984	created Open Diary, the first online blogging community	
Susan Avery	B.S.	1972	first female president and director, Woods Hole Oceanographic Institution	
Louis George Carpenter	B.S., M.S.	1879, 1883	pioneer, expert on irrigation engineering	
Rolla C. Carpenter	B.S., M.S.	1873, 1876	pioneer in heating and ventilating buildings as an Engineering Professor at Michigan State and Cornell; co-planned "Collegeville", the first subdivision in what later became East Lansing	
Lloyd Groff Copeman	B.S.	1903	invented first electric stove (precursor to the microwave oven)	
Margaret J. Eppstein	B.S.	1978	research scholar in complex systems, founder, Vermont Complex Systems Center	
Ryan M. Eustice	B.S.	1998	roboticist, senior vice president of Human-centric AI and Technology Adoption at the Toyota Research Institute	
Martha Gray	B.A.	1978	biomedical engineer, professor, MIT's Institute for Medical Engineering and Science	
Laurel Kuxhaus	B.S, B.A.	2001	biomechanical engineer and researcher, program director at the National Science Foundation, 2019–2023	
Ivan LaHaie	B.S.	1976	electrical engineer, IEEE Fellow for radar contributions	
Charles Severance	B.S. M.S. Ph.D.	1984 1990 1996	computer scientist, first executive director of the Sakai Foundation	
Janelle Shane	B.S.	2007	research scientist, author, public speaker and humorist regarding artificial intelligence	
Gary Starkweather	B.S.	1960	invented the laser printer	
Ellen D. Williams	B.S.	1976	nanotechnology researcher; member, National Academy of Sciences	

==== Law ====
Name	Degree	Year	Comments	Reference
Larry T. Garvin	B.A., B.S.	1983	Lawrence D. Stanley Professor of Law, Ohio State University Moritz College of Law, elected to the American Law Institute	
Douglas Laycock	B.A.	1970	Robert E. Scott Distinguished Professor at the University of Virginia School of Law	
Connie S. Rosati	B.A.	1979	professor of law and philosophy, University of Texas at Austin	

==== Medicine ====
Name	Degree	Year	Comments	Reference
Lisa Bero	B.S.	1980	internationally recognized former chair within the World Health Organization (WHO), professor of medical and pharmaceutical policy, University of Colorado School of Medicine	
Vence L. Bonham Jr.	B.A.	1978	deputy director of the National Human Genome Research Institute (NHGRI) of the National Institutes of Health, and leader of the NHGRI Health Disparities Unit	
Myrtelle Canavan	attended	1898–99	pioneer pathologist	
Raymond J Dingledine	B.S.	1971	professor, associate dean, Emory University, elected National Academy of Medicine, and the Norwegian Academy of Science and Letters	
Darlene Dixon	Ph.D.	1985	veterinary scientist, toxicologic pathologist, and senior investigator at the National Institutes of Health	
Max Essex	D.V.M	1967	virologist, professor (emeritus) of Health Sciences, Harvard School of Public Health	
Philip Felgner	B.S.	1972	noted immunologist, a developer of the SARS-CoV-2 vaccine	
Eldon Leroy Foltz	B.S.	1941	former chair of neurosurgery, UC Irvine School of Medicine	
Alfred D. Hershey	B.S., Ph.D.	1930, 1934	1969 Nobel laureate for physiology or medicine	
Richard E. Holmes	M.D.	1977	among the first African-Americans to attend Mississippi State University	
Mark A. Kay	B.S.	1980	physician, professor at the Stanford University School of Medicine, recognized for contributions in gene therapy, genome editing, and RNA biology	
Sharon Kujawa	B.S.		clinical audiologist, Director of Audiology Research at the Massachusetts Eye and Ear Infirmary, associate professor of otology and laryngology, Harvard Medical School	
Mary L. Marazita	B.S.	1976	geneticist, Distinguished Professor at the University of Pittsburgh School of Dental Medicine, recipient of the 2020 Distinguished Scientist Award in Craniofacial Biology Research, International Association for Dental Research	
Delano Meriwether	B.S.	1963	immunologist, first African-American accepted to Duke University School of Medicine, champion sprinter	
Vinay Prasad	B.S.	2005	professor of Epidemiology and Biostatistics, University of California, San Francisco, author	
Barbara Ross-Lee	D.O.	1969	first African-American woman dean of a U.S. medical school: New York College of Osteopathic Medicine	
Edwin Rubel	B.S. M.S. Ph.D.		leading developmental neurobiologist	
Linda C. Samuelson	B.S.	1976	pioneering physiologist in stem cell research	
Carolyn Sargent	B.A. Ph.D.	1968 1979	medical anthropologist, professor emerita of Sociocultural Anthropology and of Women, Gender, and Sexuality Studies at Washington University in St. Louis	
David Sulzer	B.S.		professor of neurobiology, Columbia, musician	
Michael VanRooyen	B.S.	1984	director, Harvard Humanitarian Initiative, Harvard Medical School	
Walter Willett	B.S.	1966	epidemiology professor, Harvard School of Public Health	

==== Physics ====
Name	Degree	Year	Comments	Reference
John G. Anderson	B.S. Physics	1970	seismologist	
Lyman J. Briggs	B.S.	1893	physicist; director of the National Bureau of Standards; chaired the Uranium Committee (precursor to the Manhattan Project)	
Gregory Charvat	B.S., M.S., Ph.D.	2002, 2003, 2007	led an MIT research team to develop radar that can penetrate walls and display real-time video of the activity on the other side	
John Park Finley	B.S.	1873	meteorologist, pioneered tornado forecasting	
Njema Frazier	Ph.D.	1997	nuclear physicist at the Department of Energy's National Nuclear Security Administration, past visiting professor at the National Defense University, named on list of "top 100 most powerful Black women"	
Scott Gaudi	B.S.	1995	professor of astronomy at Ohio State University, former chair of NASA's Exoplanet Exploration Program Analysis Group and Astrophysics Advisory Committee, co-chair of the National Academy of Sciences Exoplanet Science Strategy study	
T. A. Heppenheimer	B.S., M.S.	1967, 1968	aeronautics and space scholar, researcher and author; researcher associate fellow, American Institute of Aeronautics and Astronautics; has held research fellowships at Caltech and the Max Planck Institute	
Donald Keck	B.S., M.S.	1962, 1964	co-developed low-loss optical fiber; recipient, National Medal of Technology	
Eugene Parker	B.S.	1948	astrophysicist, developed concept of supersonic solar wind; Bruce Prize, Kyoto Prize winner	
Nan Phinney	B.S.	1966	accelerator physicist at SLAC, American Physical Society Fellow	
Charles E. St. John	B.S.	1887	physicist at Mt. Wilson observatory; starred scientist, American Men of Science, 1903–1943	
Norman Sleep	B.S.	1967	professor of geophysics, Stanford University; member, National Academy of Sciences	
Norman Sperling	B.A.	1970	astronomer, author, teacher	
Rick Stevens	attended		professor, computer science, University of Chicago, and associate laboratory director, Argonne National Laboratory	
Paula Szkody	B.S.	1970	professor, Department of Astronomy, University of Washington; past president, American Astronomical Society	
Herman Brenner White	B.S.	1970	nuclear physicist at Fermilab, won the 2010 American Physical Society Edward A. Bouchet Award	

==== Psychology ====
Name	Degree	Year	Comments	Reference
Richard N. Aslin	B.A.	1971	psychologist, focusing on speech perception	
Charles Brainerd	B.S., M.A. Ph.D.	1966 1968 1970	psychology professor, Cornell, known for co-developing fuzzy-trace theory	
Jennifer Crocker	B.A.	1975	professor, Ohio Eminent Scholar in Social Psychology at Ohio State; past president, Society for Personality and Social Psychology	
Paul Dressel	M.A.	1934	founding director of Michigan State University's Counseling Center	
David Dunning	B.A.	1982	social psychology professor, University of Michigan, co-author of the Dunning–Kruger effect	
Raquel Gur	B.S. M.A. Ph.D.	1971, 1972, 1974	research psychiatrist and expert on schizophrenia, professor at the Perelman School of Medicine at the University of Pennsylvania	
James Jackson	B.S.	1966	Distinguished University Professor of Psychology, University of Michigan, past director of the university's Institute for Social Research, named to the National Science Board	
Peter Richard Killeen	B.A.	1964	advanced psychology professor and researcher	
Joe Kort	B.A.	1985	psychotherapist, clinical social worker, board-certified clinical sexologist and author	
Rollo May	transferred		scholar, the "father of American existential psychology"	
Daniel Wegner	B.S.	1970	psychologist, introduced ironic process theory	

==== Other sciences ====
Name	Degree	Year	Comments	Reference
Edward Aboufadel	B.S.	1986	mathematics professor, elected fellow of the American Association for the Advancement of Science	
Mark Batzer	B.S. M.A.	1983 1985	geneticist, LSU Boyd Professor at Louisiana State University, elected fellow, American Association for the Advancement of Science	
Joanne Eicher	B.A. M.S. Ph.D.	1948 1952 1959	scholar in fashion design, recognized by the British Museum, editor-in-chief of the Berg Encyclopedia of World Dress and Fashion	
Harold B. Evans	B.S. M.S	1931 1932	research chemist, one of few African-American scientists to work on the Manhattan Project	
Fang Zhouzi	Ph.D.	1995	pen name of Fang Shimin; popular scientific writer in China	
Jennifer Juengel	B.S.	1987	animal health researcher, fellow of the Royal Society of New Zealand	
Julie Kovacs	B.S.	1981	bioinorganic chemist and professor, University of Washington	
Verghese Kurien	M.S.	1948	dairy scientist, father of White Revolution in India; Padma Vibhushan recipient	
Steven Lalley	B.S	1976	statistician and mathematician, professor, former department chair at The University of Chicago	
Daniel Mindiola	B.S.	1992	professor of Chemistry at the University of Pennsylvania	
Jennifer Tank	B.S.	1988	ecologist, Galla Professor of Ecology of Streams and Rivers at the University of Notre Dame	
Chelsea Walton	B.S.	2005	mathematician, professor at Rice University, won a fellowship to the Alfred P. Sloan Foundation (the fourth African-American to do so) as well as to the American Mathematical Society	
Bess Ward	B.S.	1976	William J. Sinclair Professor of Geosciences, director of Ward Research Laboratory, Princeton University	

==== Social science ====
Name	Degree	Year	Comments	Reference
Jeffrey Arnett	B.S.	1980	Clark University professor who carved out the research discipline "emerging adulthood", for which he coined the term	
David W. Blight	B.A.	1971	Sterling Professor of History, African American Studies, Yale, Pulitzer Prize winner	
Charles Butterworth	B.A.	1959	political philosophy scholar focusing on the Greek, medieval Islamic, and Enlightenment periods	
Annping Chin	B.S.	1972	historian and sinologist, senior lecturer at Yale	
Angela D. Dillard	B.A.	1988	scholar and author in African-American Studies, University of Michigan	
Robert E. Hegel	B.A.	1965	sinologist, Liselotte Dieckman Professor of Comparative Literature and Chinese, Washington University in St. Louis	
Abdi Kusow	B.A.	1990	Somali sociology scholar	
Anthony Leiserowitz	B.A.	1990	researcher, human geographer at Yale University, director of the Yale Program on Climate Change Communication	
Yvonna Sessions Lincoln	A.B.	1967	methodologist and higher-education scholar, Distinguished Professor of Higher Education and Human Resource Development at Texas A&M University	
Theodore J. Lowi	B.A.	1954	Political Science Scholar; author of treatise The End of Liberalism; Distinguished Professor, Cornell University; voted one of the most influential political thinkers of the modern era by the American Political Science Association	
W.J.T. Mitchell	B.A.	1963	Gaylord Donnelley Distinguished Service Professor of English and Art History, University of Chicago, Guggenheim Fellow	
Stephen O. Murray	B.A.	1972	scholar of gay anthropology, sociology	
Ted Peters	B.A.	1963	Lutheran theologian, professor emeritus	
James Piereson	B.A., Ph.D.	1968. 1973	pollical science educator, president, William E. Simon Foundation, former executive director and trustee, John M. Olin Foundation	
Erik Qualman	B.A.	1994	world-wide digital influencer, best-selling author	
Michael L. Radelet	B.A.	1972	death penalty scholar, professor emeritus, criminology, former department chair, University of Colorado	
Andrew Rossos	B.A.	1963	international authority on Macedonian history, professor emeritus, University of Toronto	
Peter Schmidt	B.A., M.A., Ph.D.	1969, 1970, 1970	MSU Distinguished Professor, econometrics pioneer	
Theda Skocpol	B.A.	1969	former dean, Harvard Graduate School of Arts and Sciences; appointed senior adviser in the social sciences to Harvard's Radcliffe Institute for Advanced Study	
Rogers Smith	B.A.	1974	distinguished professor, political science, University of Pennsylvania	
Douglas V. Steere	B.S.	1923	Quaker philosopher, religious leader, Rhodes Scholar (1925)	
Marilyn Stokstad	M.A.	1953	art historian	
Linda Waite	B.A.	1969	George Herbert Mead Distinguished Service Professor of Sociology at the University of Chicago	
John D. Woodbridge	M.A.	1965	research professor of Church History and Christian Thought at Trinity Evangelical Divinity School	
Richard Yarborough	B.A.	1973	professor of English and African American literature; faculty research associate; former interim director, Ralph J. Bunche Center for African American Studies, UCLA	

=== Arts and media ===
==== Cinema ====
Name	Degree	Year	Comments	Reference
James Caan	did not graduate		actor, Las Vegas series, The Godfather, Mickey Blue Eyes	
Jim Cash	B.A.	1970	Hollywood writer, Top Gun, Legal Eagles, Dick Tracy	
Areeya Chumsai	B.A.	1993	filmmaker, author, lecturer, teacher, journalist and former Miss Thailand	
Michael Cimino	B.A.	1959	Academy Award-winning writer, director; directed, co-wrote The Deer Hunter	
Edward S. Feldman	B.A.	1950	film and television producer	
Sarah Habel	B.A.	2004	actress	
Greg Harrison	B.A.	1991	film director of Groove (2000) and November (2004)	
Anthony Heald	B.A.	1971	actor, The Silence of the Lambs	
Walter Hill	B.A.	1962	producer, director of Last Man Standing and 48 Hrs.	
David Magee	B.A.	1984	screenwriter, nominated for 2004 Academy Award for Finding Neverland	
Bill Mechanic	B.A.	1973	CEO, Pandemonium Films; former CEO, 20th Century Fox; producer of 82nd Academy Awards	
Bob Murawski	B.A.		film editor, winner, 2010 Academy Award for editing The Hurt Locker	
Sam Raimi	did not graduate		director, producer, actor (Spider-Man, Evil Dead series)	
Michealene Risley	B.A.		writer, director; human rights activist	
Tom Sizemore	did not graduate		actor, Saving Private Ryan	
Bernard White	B.A.		actor, screenwriter and film director	

==== Journalism ====
Name	Degree	Year	Comments	Reference
Tim Alberta	B.A.	2008	journalist and author, has written articles for The Hotline, The Wall Street Journal, The National Journal, The National Review, Politico, and The Atlantic	
Amy Astley	B.A.	1989	editor-in-chief, Architectural Digest, founded Teen Vogue	
Ray Stannard Baker	B.S.	1889	early 20th-century "muckraker" journalist; won 1940 Pulitzer Prize for last two volumes of biography of President Woodrow Wilson	
Jack Berry	B.S.	1956	sports journalist with The Detroit News, the Detroit Free Press, United Press International, and the Golf Writers' Association of America	
Richard Cooper	B.A.	1969	won 1972 Pulitzer Prize for Attica Prison riot coverage	
Craig Custance	B.A.	1999	sports journalist, author	
M.L. Elrick	B.A.	1990	2009 Pulitzer Prize for local reporting, Detroit Free Press	
Ryan Field	B.A.	1999	sports anchor, WABC-TV	
Martin Finn	B.A.	2002	Fox News Channel producer for anchor Shepard Smith	
Susan Goldberg	B.A.	1984	editor-in-chief of National Geographic, editorial director, National Geographic Partners; first woman to hold position in National Geographic's history (published since 1888)	
Don Gonyea	B.A.	1978	White House correspondent, National Public Radio; won Peabody Award	
Chris Hansen	B.A.		Dateline NBC correspondent	
Tanya Hart	B.A.		Emmy Award-winning commentator, host of Hollywood Live with Tanya Hart, syndicated on American Urban Radio Networks; owns Tanya Hart Communications, Inc., a multimedia company	
Thom Hartmann	B.A.		broadcaster on Free Speech TV (formerly of Air America Radio), author	
Jemele Hill	B.A.	1997	columnist, The Atlantic, former television host at ESPN, columnist for ESPN Page 2	
Jacob Kornbluth	B.A.	1994	Emmy-winning documentarian	
Adrienne LaFrance	B.A.	2004	executive editor of The Atlantic	
Wanda Lau	B.S.		editor of technology and practice for Architect Magazine	
Myra MacPherson	B.A.	1956	Pulitzer Prize nominee, journalist, author	
James C. Moore	B.A.	1974	award-winning writer (including an Emmy, Edward R. Murrow Award, and Dartmouth College National Media Award for Economic Understanding); New York Times bestseller (as co-author) of Bush's Brain: How Karl Rove Made George W. Bush Presidential	
Suzanne Sena	B.A.		Fox News anchor	
Fay Gillis Wells	did not graduate		first woman to parachute from an aircraft; White House correspondent for Storer Broadcasting Co.	

==== Literature ====
Name	Degree	Year	Comments	Reference
Verna Aardema	B.A.	1934	award-winning author of children's novels using an African motif	
Diane Asitimbay	B.A.		author, poet, teacher, and intercultural trainer	
Wilton Barnhardt	B.A.	1982	novelist; director of M.F.A. program in Creative Writing, NC State University; former Sports Illustrated reporter	
Tom Bissell	B.A.	1996	author, journalist	
Jan Harold Brunvand	B.A.	1955	writer, folklorist scholar, popularized the term "urban legend"	
Stephanie Burgis	attended		fantasy novelist, music historian	
Jeanne Cavelos	B.S.	1982	science fiction writer, editor, educator, and former astrophysicist	
Kelly DiPucchio	B.A.	1989	author of children's books	
Carolyn Forché	B.A.	1972	poet, editor, human rights advocate	
Richard Ford	B.A.	1966	writer of novel Independence Day; first to win both the Pulitzer Prize and PEN/Faulkner Award	
R. Barri Flowers	B.A., M.S.	1977, 1980	author of fiction and nonfiction; inducted into MSU Criminal Justice Wall of Fame in 2006	
Peter Gent	B.A.	1964	novelist, athlete, wrote novel-turned-film North Dallas Forty	
Dan Gerber	B.A.	1962	poet, novelist and essayist	
Jennifer Greene	B.A.		romance novelist, published 85 books, inducted into Romance Writers of America Hall of Fame	
Jim Harrison	B.A., M.A.	1960, 1966	author, Guggenheim Fellowship recipient; novel, Legends of the Fall, basis for Hollywood film of same name	
Jim C. Hines	B.S.	1996	fantasy and science fiction writer	
Helen Hull	attended	1905–07	novelist, early feminist, English professor, Wellesley, Columbia	
Cynthia Huntington	B.A.		poet	
Beverly Jenkins	B.A.		novelist of mainly African-American historical romance, noted as one of the "100 most popular African American authors"	
Geoff Johns	B.A.	1995	award-winning comic book author (Sinestro Corps War, Blackest Night), New York Times bestselling author	
Josh Kilmer-Purcell	B.A.	1991	New York Times bestselling author of memoirs I Am Not Myself These Days and The Bucolic Plague, novel Candy Everybody Wants, and The Beekman 1802 Heirloom Cookbook; starred in television reality series The Fabulous Beekman Boys	
Michael Kimball	B.A.	1990	novelist, founding editor of Taint Magazine	
J.T. Krul	B.A.	1995	comic book writer, published in Marvel and DC Comics	
Michael P. Kube-McDowell	B.A.	1976	award-winning science fiction writer; author of more than 500 nonfiction articles	
Allison Leotta	B.A.	1991	crime thriller novelist, former federal prosecutor	
Josh Malerman	B.A.		musician, novelist, novel Bird Box basis for Hollywood film	
Tom McGuane	B.A.	1962	novelist	
Nnedi Okorafor	M.A.		science fiction/fantasy novelist	
Daniel O'Malley	B.A.		novelist	
Janice Radway	B.A.	1971	author, literary and cultural studies scholar	
Alma Routsong	B.A.	1949	author, alternative fiction	
Pat Schmatz	B.S.	1983	author of young adult fiction	
Sandra Seaton	M.A.	1989	playwright and librettist	
Elizabeth Sims	B.A.		novelist, crime and mystery writer; Lambda Literary Award winner; contributing editor at Writer's Digest magazine	
Robin Sloan	B.A.	2002	noted novelist, short story writer, literary magazine founder, columnist,The Atlantic	
Vernor Vinge	B.S.		science fiction writer; retired math and computer science professor, San Diego State University	
Bob Wood	B.A.	1980	author of Dodger Dogs to Fenway Franks and Big Ten Country	
Timothy Zahn	B.S.	1973	science fiction writer; winner of Hugo Award for novella Cascade Point; author of New York Times best-selling Star Wars novel Heir to the Empire	

==== Music ====
Name	Degree	Year	Comments	Reference
Bethany Beardslee	B.A.	1948	soprano noted for her performances of contemporary classical music	
Dee Dee Bridgewater	did not graduate		Grammy- and Tony Award-winning jazz singer, actress	
Henry Butler	M.M.	1974	jazz pianist	
James Chance	attended		no wave jazz musician	
Dorothy DeLay	B.M.	1936	master violin teacher; trained superstars Itzhak Perlman, Cho-Liang Lin, Midori, and Sarah Chang	
Thaddeus Dixon	B.M.	2006	songwriter, music producer, director, and instructor at UC Berkeley	
Clare Fischer	B.M.	1951	Grammy Award-winning composer, arranger, and pianist; Latin jazz motif	
GRiZ	did not graduate		DJ and electronic producer	
Tee Grizzley	did not graduate		rapper, singer, and songwriter; "First Day Out"	
Milt Jackson	did not graduate		jazz vibraphonist; member of the Modern Jazz Quartet	
Doug Johnson	B.M.	1986	jazz and classical pianist, performer and teacher at Berklee College of Music and Wellesley College	
Angela Lanza	B.A.	2006	singer, toured overseas with USO	
Lazarus	medicine (did not graduate)		rapper, songwriter	
Jacques Levy	Ph.D.	1961	lyricist, librettist and theatrical director whose collaborators included Bob Dylan, Roger McGuinn and Lucy Simon; others who have performed his work include Joe Cocker, Crystal Gayle and Carly Simon	
Joseph Lulloff	B.A., M.A.		saxophonist performing with numerous major orchestras, educator, Distinguished Professor at the Michigan State University College of Music	
David Maslanka	M.M., Ph.D.	1967, 1971	composer, best known for his works for wind ensemble	
Dika Newlin	B.M.	1940	musicologist, composer, pianist	
Izler Solomon	B.M.		conductor, led major Midwest city orchestras; founder, Lansing Symphony Orchestra	
Robin Spielberg	attended		noted pianist, composer, actress, and author	
Noel Paul Stookey	did not graduate		"Paul" of 60s folk group Peter, Paul and Mary	
Ben Williams	B.M.	2007	jazz bassist, winner of the 2009 Thelonious Monk Award	
Janet Williams	B.M.	1982	internationally renowned soprano	

==== Television and radio ====
Name	Degree	Year	Comments	Reference
John Ahlers	B.A.		Anaheim Ducks play-by-play announcer	
Emanuele Berry	B.A.	2012	writer, radio producer, and journalist; executive editor at This American Life, and Fulbright recipient	
Tom Bodett	did not graduate		author, satirist, pitchman for Motel 6	
Chayse Dacoda	attended		interior designer, television personality, Emmy nominee	
Ryan Devlin	B.A.	2003	actor, TV host, producer	
Carol Duvall	B.A.		long-running host of The Carol Duvall Show, HGTV	
Chad Everett	did not graduate		actor, starred in Medical Center	
Pat Foley	B.A.	1977	TV play-by-play announcer for the Chicago Blackhawks; inductee in the Chicago Sports Hall of Fame	
Dan Gheesling	B.A., M.A.	2005, 2006	Big Brother 10 winner; Big Brother 14 runner-up	
Timothy Granaderos		2009	actor and model, starred in T@gged, 13 Reasons Why, in addition to several music videos	
Bob Guiney	B.A.	1993	appeared on The Bachelor's fourth season	
Jon-Erik Hexum	B.A.	1980	actor, starred in Voyagers!, Making of a Male Model, and Cover Up	
Stephanie Koenig	B.F.A.	2009	actor, several TV series starring roles	
Kay Koplovitz	M.A.	1968	founded USA Networks and the Sci-Fi Channel in 1992; women's business advocate	
Jim Kozimor	B.A.	1982	national sportscaster mainly with the NBC network, three-time Emmy Award winner	
Jackie Martling	B.S.	1971	stand-up comedian, member of The Howard Stern Show until 2001	
Matt McConnell	B.A.	1985	television play-by-play broadcaster, Arizona Coyotes (NHL); 2013 Arizona Sports Broadcaster of the Year	
Rachel Miskowiec	B.A.	1992	TV producer	
Tyler Oakley	B.A.	2011	YouTube video blogger and internet personality	
Tim O'Brien	B.A.		lawyer, professor, award-winning legal correspondent at ABC News and CNN	
Susan Packard	B.A., M.A.	1979, 1981	founding CEO of HGTV (1997 Cable TV "Woman of the Year"); president of brand outreach for Scripps Networks New Ventures	
James Quello	B.A.	1935	former chairman of the Federal Communications Commission (FCC)	
Jay Schadler	B.A.	1974	ABC News correspondent, Emmy Award winner	
Susan Spencer	B.A.	1968	CBS News correspondent, Emmy Award winner	
Ed Swiderski	B.S.	2002	The Bachelorette season 5 contestant and winner	
Robert Urich	M.A.	1971	actor, Vega$ and Spenser: For Hire	
Mike Valenti	B.A.	2002	host of the Valenti and Foster show on 97.1 The Ticket, WXYT-FM	

==== Theatre ====
Name	Degree	Year	Comments	Reference
William David Brohn	B.A.	1955	Tony Award-winning Broadway musical arranger for Ragtime; won Drama Desk Award for Miss Saigon orchestration	
Robert Lyons	B.A.		writer, playwright, director	
Kęstutis Nakas	B.A.	1975	playwright, author, performer, director, and teacher	
Michael P. Price	B.A.	1969	executive director of Goodspeed Musicals, the major producer of American musical theatre	

==== Visual arts ====
Name	Degree	Year	Comments	Reference
Mona A. El-Bayoumi	B.F.A.	1985	painter, mixed media artist	
Ginger Gilmour	special course		sculptor	
Judith Hahn	M.F.A.		painter and printmaker	
Thomas Kovachevich	B.A.	1964	contemporary visual artist and physician	
Eric Millikin			painter, webcomics artist, Pulitzer winner	
Shani Peters	B.A.	2002	multidisciplinary artist	

=== Business ===
==== Consumer goods ====
Name	Degree	Year	Comments	Reference
Michael R. Cannon	B.A.		president of Global Operations, Dell	
Drayton McLane, Jr.	M.B.A.	1959	owner of Houston Astros; director of Wal-Mart Stores Inc.	
Mark A. Murray	B.A.		president and CEO of Meijer; former president of Grand Valley State University (2001–2006)	

==== Finance ====
Name	Degree	Year	Comments	Reference
Thomas H. Bailey	B.A.	1961	founder and former CEO, Janus Capital Group	
Eli Broad	B.B.A.	1954	billionaire industrialist and philanthropist; former CEO of AIG	
Dan Gilbert	B.B.A.	1982	chairman and founder of Quicken Loans; owner, NBA's Cleveland Cavaliers	
Tom Gores	B.S.	1986	global private-equity magnate, billionaire, owner of NBA's Detroit Pistons	
Ernest Green	B.A., M.A.	1962, 1964	Little Rock Nine member; assistant labor secretary (Carter administration); vice president, manager at Lehman Brothers	
Andrew Lahde	B.A.		former hedge fund manager, founder, Lahde Capital	
M. Peter McPherson	B.A.	1963	chairman, Dow Jones; president of the National Association of State Universities and Land-Grant Colleges; MSU president 1993–2004	
William Raduchel	B.A.	1966	independent director, advisor, former Harvard professor	
Edward W. Scott	B.A., M.A.		businessman, philanthropist	

==== Industry ====
Name	Degree	Year	Comments	Reference
Darius Adamczyk	B.S.	1988	chairman (and former CEO) of Honeywell International Inc., elected, National Academy of Engineering	
Montie Brewer	B.B.A.		former president and CEO, Air Canada	
Rufus T. Bush	did not graduate		19th-century oil refining industrialist, yachtsman, New York socialite	
Jack DeBoer	B.A.	1952	hotelier, founder of five national hotel brands, including Residence Inn	
Jim Delligatti	B.A.	1964	creator of the Big Mac sandwich, owner of over 50 McDonald's restaurants	
Chris Denson	graduated		innovation expert, marketer, humorist, host of podcast Innovation Crush, director of Ignition Factory, Omnicom Group	
Molly Fletcher	B.A.	1993	sports agent, president of client representation, Career Sports & Entertainment	
Mary Kay Henry	B.A.	1979	president, Service Employees International Union	
James P. Hoffa	B.A.	1963	president, Teamsters; son of Jimmy Hoffa	
Walter T. Kelley	B.S.	1919	founded beekeeping supply company the Walter T. Kelley Company in 1926 (later, the Kelly Company)	
Laura M. Labovich	B.A.	1994	author, national job search expert, speaker, CEO	
Michael Lamach	B.S.	1985	CEO, Ingersoll-Rand Corp.	
Joanne M. Maguire	B.S.	1975	executive vice president of Lockheed Martin Space Systems, 2006–2013	
Russell Mawby	B.S., Ph.D.	1959	philanthropist, 25-year CEO, W.K. Kellogg Foundation	
John H. McConnell	B.B.A.	1949	founder, chairman emeritus, Worthington Industries; former owner of NHL's Columbus Blue Jackets	
Craig Menear	B.B.A.	1979	president, CEO, Home Depot	
Dawn Riley	B.A.	1986	first female yachting CEO; America's Cup participant; educator	
Andy Roeser	B.A.	1981	former president of the Los Angeles Clippers of the NBA	
Reinhold Schmieding	B.A.	1977	specialized medical tools manufacturer, Forbes 400 billionaire	
JR Shaw	B.B.A.	1955	Canadian communications company founder/owner	
Rick Sirvaitis	B.A., M.A.	1971, 1976	president of Storeboard Media LLC.	
Robert C. Stempel	M.B.A.	1970	former chairman, CEO, General Motors	
Paul Waterman	B.S.	1987	CEO of BP Castrol and Elementis Plc	
Kate Williams			chef and restaurateur, owner of Lady of the House in Detroit	

=== Politics and government ===
==== Activism ====
Name	Degree	Year	Comments	Reference
John H. Adams	B.A.	1959	environmental activist, lawyer, and co-founder of the Natural Resource Defense Council, awarded the Presidential Medal of Freedom	
Abraham Aiyash	B.A.	2017	US foreign policy activist, House majority floor leader, Michigan House of Representatives, 4th legislative district	
Suzanne Marie Babich	B.S.	1981	public health scientist, author, dietitian and vegetarianism activist, professor, Fulbright Award winner	
Gladys Beckwith	B.A., M.A. Ph.D.	1951 1956 1968	activist, founder of the Michigan Women's Hall of Fame	
Richard Conlin	B.A.	1968	affordable housing activist and developer, former member of the Seattle City Council president	
Donald N. Duquette	B.A.	1969	founding director of the Child Advocacy Law Clinic, University of Michigan Law School	
Emma Genevieve Gillette	B.S.	1920	"mother of Michigan's State Park system"	
Shelly Grabe	B.A.	1996	women's rights activist, social psychology professor, provost, UC Santa Cruz	
Florence Hall	B.S.	1909	led Woman's Land Army of America during World War II	
Rutherford P. Hayes	attended	1876-77	library innovator, banker, son of U.S. President Rutherford B. Hayes	
Jon Hoadley	B.A.	2006	former executive director, National Stonewall Democrats	
Susan Jacoby	B.A.	1965	journalist; author, Freethinkers: A History of American Secularism; NYC program director, Center for Inquiry	
Russell Kirk	B.A.	1940	National Review magazine co-founder, "father of the modern conservative movement"	
Jeffrey Miller	transferred		Kent State shootings victim	
Michael Schwerner	transferred		civil rights activist, martyr; along with James Chaney and Andrew Goodman, was murdered by Philadelphia, MS-area Ku Klux Klan members for his African-American voter registration efforts during Freedom Summer, 1964	
Lou Sheldon	B.A.	1957	evangelical conservative activist, founder and chairman of the Traditional Values Coalition	
Jim Wallis	B.A.	1970	liberal Christian evangelical activist; author, God's Politics: Why the Right Gets It Wrong and the Left Doesn't Get It	

==== Diplomacy ====
Name	Degree	Year	Comments	Reference
Richard Clark Barkley	B.A.	1954	former U.S. ambassador to East Germany and Turkey	
Stuart A. Bernstein	B.A.	1960	former U.S. ambassador to Denmark	
Clarence A. Boonstra	B.A.	1936	former US ambassador to Costa Rica	
Robin Diallo	B.A.	1982	former US ambassador to Haiti	
John A. Heffern	B.A.	1976	former United States ambassador to Armenia 2011–2014	
Donna Hrinak	B.A.	1972	U.S. ambassador to Venezuela	
Riina Kionka	B.A.	1983	EU ambassador to Pakistan	
John C. Kornblum	B.A.	1964	former ambassador to Germany	
Roger A. Meece	B.S.	1971	former U.S. ambassador to Malawi and Congo	
Peter F. Secchia	B.A.	1963	former U.S. ambassador to Italy	

==== Armed forces ====
Name	Degree	Year	Comments	Reference
Judith Fedder	B.S.	1980	lieutenant general of the United States Air Force	
William F. Friedman	attended		leading cryptographer, led the research division of the U.S. Army's Signal Intelligence Service	
James D. Hittle	B.S.	1937	brigadier general, U.S. Marine Corps	
John D. Hutson	B.A.	1969	former president and dean, Franklin Pierce Law Center, rear admiral (retired), U.S. Navy; former Staff Judge Advocate and executive assistant to the commander, Naval Investigative Command	
Frederick J. Kenney	B.A.	1981	former rear admiral and Judge Advocate General, U.S. Coast Guard	
William J. Maddox Jr	B.A.	1944	major general in the United States Army, commander of the United States Army Aviation Center	
Paul T. Mikolashek	M.A.	1982	U.S. Army lieutenant general	
George F. Schulgen	B.S.	1922	former brigadier general, U.S. Air Force	
Caral Spangler	B.A.	1980	assistant secretary, US Army	
Donald A. Stroh	B.S.	1915	U.S. Army major general	
Frances C. Wilson	B.S.		retired lieutenant general of United States Marine Corps; former president of National Defense University	

==== Law ====
Name	Degree	Year	Comments	Reference
Rosemarie Aquilina	B.A.	1979	judge of the 30th Circuit Court in Ingham County, Michigan, presided over the trial and sentencing of Larry Nassar	
Dennis Archer	J.D.	1970^{†}	former president of the American Bar Association, the first African-American elected to the position; former justice, Michigan Supreme Court; former mayor of Detroit, chairman of Detroit-based law firm Dickinson Wright	
W. Scott Bales	B.A.	1978	justice, Arizona Supreme Court	
Debra Bowen	B.A.	1979	California secretary of state	
William L. Carpenter	B.S.	1876	justice, Michigan Supreme Court	
Robert Hardy Cleland	B.A.	1969	judge, US District Court for the Eastern District of Michigan	
Jeffrey Cummings	B.A.	1984	judge, US District Court for the Northern District of Illinois	
John F. Dean	B.S.	1970	first African-American judge, US Tax Court	
Geoffrey Fieger	J.D.	1979^{†}	attorney for Jack Kevorkian; 1998 Democratic candidate for Michigan governor	
John Warner Fitzgerald	B.A.		former chief justice, Michigan Supreme Court	
John D. Hutson	B.A.	1969	president, Franklin Pierce Law Center; rear admiral (retired), U.S. Navy	
Kathleen Jansen	B.S.	1971	judge, Michigan Court of Appeals	
Wallace B. Jefferson	B.A.	1985	first African-American chief justice, Supreme Court of Texas	
Kirsten Frank Kelly	B.A.	1978	judge, Michigan Court of Appeals	
Allan Kornblum	B.S.	1958	United States magistrate judge	
Carlotta Walls LaNier	transferred		Little Rock Nine member; real estate entrepreneur in Englewood, Colorado	
Michael W. McConnell	B.A.	1976	former judge, United States Court of Appeals for the Tenth Circuit	
Allen B. Morse	Graduated	1859	justice, Michigan Supreme Court, 1886–93	
Gordon Jay Quist	B.A.	1959	judge, U.S. District Court for the Western District of Michigan	
Louise Renne	B.A.	1958	former city-county attorney and member of the San Francisco Board of Supervisors	
Robert Ressler	B.S., M.S.	1972	criminologist, coined the term "serial killer"	
Andree Layton Roaf	B.S.	1972	first African-American woman on the Arkansas Supreme Court	
Kenneth Sanborn	B.A.		lawyer whose key 1953 legal defense helped turn public opinion against McCarthyism	
Virgil C. Smith	B.A.		former state representative, senator, judge on the 3rd Circuit Court in Wayne County, Michigan	
Kara Farnandez Stoll	B.S.	1991	judge, U.S. Court of Appeals, Federal Circuit	
Valerie Zachary	B.A. with honor	1984	judge, North Carolina Court of Appeals	
†Graduate of the Detroit College of Law before its merger with Michigan State

==== Public office ====
Name	Degree	Year	Comments	Reference
Spencer Abraham	B.A.	1974	former U.S. Secretary of Energy and U.S. senator from Michigan	
Sandra E. Adams	B.A.	1978	rear admiral in U.S. Navy	
Abraham Aiyash	B.A.	2017	representative, 9th district, Michigan	
Tylease Alli	B.A.	2002	reading clerk, Democratic, US House of Representatives	
George R. Ariyoshi	B.A.	1949	third governor of Hawaii	
Adnan Badran	M.A., Ph.D.	1961, 1963	former prime minister of Jordan	
James Blanchard	B.A.	1964	former Michigan governor (1983–1991); former ambassador to Canada (1993–1996; appointed by President Bill Clinton)	
Eljay B. Bowron	B.S.	1973	former director of the US Secret Service; chairman and co-founder, Torchstone Global, LLC, a security company	
Augustus Caine	Ph.D.		Secretary of Education of Liberia, 1965–1970	
Albert J. Campbell	attended	1870s	representative, U.S. Congress, Montana 1899–1901	
Linda Chapin	B.A.		first chairman of the Orange County Commission in Florida; unsuccessful candidate for the U.S. House of Representatives in 2000	
Ted Chudleigh	B.S.	1965	member, Legislative Assembly of Ontario (Canada)	
Donald G. Cook	B.S.	1969	commander, Air Education and Training Command, U.S. Air Force	
Richard Cordray	B.A.	1981	Ohio state treasurer (2007–2009); Ohio attorney general (2009–2011); inaugural chief, United States Consumer Financial Protection Bureau (2011–2017)	
Charles Dwight Curtiss	B.S.	1911	former commissioner, Federal Highway Administration	
Charles J. DeLand	B.S.	1899	Michigan secretary of state, 1921–1926	
Nancy Dick	B.A.	1951	former lieutenant governor, Colorado, first woman to hold this office	
Emily Dievendorf	B.A.	2001	representative, Michigan House of Representatives, 77th district, first openly nonbinary Michigan state representative	
Tony Earl	B.A.	1958	former Wisconsin governor (currently on governing board, Common Cause-Wisconsin)	
John Engler	B.S.	1971	former Michigan governor (1991–2003)	
Bob Evnen	B.A.	1974	secretary of state, Nebraska	
Robert A. Ficano	B.A.	1974	former Wayne County (Michigan) executive	
Jason E. Hammond	B.S., M.S.	1886, 1900	former Michigan superintendent of Public Instruction	
Penny Harrington	B.A.	1964	former police chief; first woman to head a major US city police force (Portland, Oregon)	
Jim Hill	B.A.	1969	first African-American elected statewide in Oregon	
Derek Hodge	B.A.	1963	former lieutenant governor, U.S. Virgin Islands	
Jennifer White Holland	B.A.	2010	delegate, Maryland House of Delegates for District 10	
Tim Johnson		1970–1971	Democratic senator of South Dakota (1997–present)	
Don A. Jones	B.S.	1933	rear admiral and civil engineer; served as the seventh director of the United States Coast and Geodetic Survey and second director of the Environmental Science Services Administration Corps	
Lawrence Kestenbaum	B.A.	1979	attorney, politician, and the creator and webmaster of the Political Graveyard website	
H. Stuart Knight	B.S.	1948	director of the U.S. Secret Service	
Jerry Knirk	B.S.	1974	doctor and politician, served in the New Hampshire House of Representatives	
Moussa Koussa	B.A.	1978	former foreign minister of Libya, 2009–2011	
Lee Wan-koo	M.S.	1984	prime minister of South Korea	
Wilson Livingood	B.A.	1961	former United States House sergeant at arms	
Chris Magnus	B.A.		chief of police of Tucson, Arizona	
Mark Mazur	B.A.	1978	former assistant secretary, U.S. Department of the Treasury	
Eileen McNulty	B.A.		government official, first female chair of the White House Council on Environmental Quality	
Chris Meagher	B.A.	2005	former assistant to the Secretary of Defense for Public Affairs	
Harry Moniba	Ph.D.		vice president of Liberia, 1984–90	
William Penn Mott Jr.	B.S.	1931	former director of the National Park Service	
Frederick H. Mueller	B.S.	1914	former United States Secretary of Commerce under President Dwight Eisenhower	
Shahzada Jamal Nazir	B.A.	1999	former federal minister for the ministries of National Health Services, Religious Affairs, National Harmony, National Heritage & Integration, in the government of Pakistan	
Bryan Newland	B.A., J.D.	2003, 2007	assistant secretary of the Interior for Indian Affairs	
James S. Nunneley		1933	former Republican member of the Michigan House of Representatives	
Diane Pappas	B.A.		Democratic member of the Illinois House of Representatives	
Gregory Quinn	B.A.	1972	representative, St. Louis County Council, attorney	
Peter Rheinstein	B.A., M.S.	1964	former official of the Food and Drug Administration	
Kristen McDonald Rivet	B.A.	1992	U.S. congresswoman for Michigan's 8th congressional district	
Kathleen D. Roe	B.A., M.A.		former director of Archives and Records Management Operations at the New York State Archives	
Helen Rosenthal	B.A.	1982	New York City Council member, 6th District	
Debbie Stabenow	B.A., M.A.	1972, 1975	U.S. senator from Michigan	
David A. Stockman	B.A.	1968	former director of Office of Management and Budget under President Ronald Reagan	
Marta Suplicy	B.A. in Psychology		mayor of São Paulo, 2001–2004; senator for São Paulo, 2010–present	
Clay Tallman	B.A.	1895	commissioner, United States General Land Office, member of Nevada State Senate 1909–1913, president pro tempore	
Bob Traxler	B.A.	1953	U.S. Congress, Michigan, 1974–93; Mackinac Island State Park Commission, 1992–present	
John P. Walters	B.A.	1974	former director, Office of National Drug Control Policy	
Fred M. Warner	attended, did not graduate	1880s	governor of Michigan, 1905–1911	
Gretchen Whitmer	B.A., J.D.	1993, 1998	49th governor of Michigan, second woman to hold the position	

=== Sports and athletics ===
==== Baseball ====
Name	Degree	Year	Comments	Reference
Steve Garvey	B.A.	1968	former first baseman, Los Angeles Dodgers	
Kirk Gibson	B.A.	1979	former manager, Arizona Diamondbacks; former outfielder, Detroit Tigers, Los Angeles Dodgers	
Mike Marshall	B.S., M.S., PhD	1965, 1967, 1978	former closer for several Major League teams	
Anthony Misiewicz			current pitcher, Seattle Mariners	
Mark Mulder	B.A.	1998	former pitcher, St. Louis Cardinals	
Dale Petroskey	B.A.	1978	president, National Baseball Hall of Fame and Museum	
Robin Roberts	B.A.	1947	former pitcher, Philadelphia Phillies; Hall of Fame member	

==== Basketball ====
Name	Degree	Year	Comments	Reference
Maurice Ager			former professional basketball player	
Alan Anderson			former professional basketball player	
Charlie Bell	B.S.	2000	former professional basketball player	
Miles Bridges			professional basketball player for the Charlotte Hornets	
Shannon Brown			professional basketball player with the Miami Heat	
Ben Carter			professional basketball player in the Israel Basketball Premier League	
Mateen Cleaves	B.S.	2000	former professional basketball player	
Deyonta Davis			professional basketball player	
Paul Davis			former professional basketball player	
Draymond Green	B.A.	2012	professional basketball player with the Golden State Warriors	
Johnny Green			former professional basketball player	
Gary Harris			professional basketball player with the Denver Nuggets	
Mark Hollis	B.S.	1985	former team manager; current athletic director	
Jaren Jackson Jr.			professional basketball player with the Memphis Grizzlies	
Earvin "Magic" Johnson			businessman and former Los Angeles Lakers basketball player	
Greg Kelser			broadcaster and former professional basketball player	
Erazem Lorbek			former professional basketball player	
Kalin Lucas			professional basketball player Forlì of the Serie A2	
Matt Mazza			former professional basketball player	
Adreian Payne	B.S.	2014	professional basketball player	
Morris Peterson	B.S.	2000	former professional basketball player	
Zach Randolph			former professional basketball player	
Shawn Respert	B.A.	1995	former professional basketball player	
Jason Richardson			former professional basketball player	
Scott Skiles	B.S.	1986	former professional basketball player, former coach of the Chicago Bulls	
Steve Smith	B.S.	1991	former professional basketball player; philanthropist	
Eric Snow	B.S.	1995	former professional basketball player	
Denzel Valentine			professional basketball player for the Chicago Bulls	
Sam Vincent	B.S.	1981	former professional basketball player	
Kevin Willis	B.S.	1984	former professional basketball player	

- Malik Hall (born 2000), basketball player in the Israeli Basketball Premier League

==== Bodybuilding ====
Name	Degree	Year	Comments	Reference
Colette Nelson	B.S.		IFBB professional bodybuilder	

==== Football ====
Name	Degree	Year	Comments	Reference				
Flozell Adams	B.A.	1998	former offensive tackle, Dallas Cowboys					
Herb Adderley	B.S.	1961	former cornerback, Green Bay Packers; elected to the Pro Football Hall of Fame in 1980					
Brian Allen	B.A.	2017	center, Los Angeles Rams					
Denicos Allen	B.S.	2014	linebacker, Tampa Bay Buccaneers					
Morten Andersen	B.A.	1982	former placekicker, New Orleans Saints; all-time leading scorer in NFL history					
Fred Arbanas	B.A.	1961	former tight end, Kansas City Chiefs					
Edwin Baker	B.A.	2013	running back, New Orleans Saints					
Tony Banks	B.A.	1996	former quarterback, Houston Texans					
Le'Veon Bell			NFL running back, Kansas City Chiefs					
Larry Bethea	B.A.	1977	former NFL defensive end, Dallas Cowboys					
Ed Budde	B.S.	1963	former offensive lineman, Kansas City Chiefs					
Max Bullough	B.A.	2014	former NFL linebacker, Houston Texans					
Derek Bunch		1985	former NFL linebacker, Washington Redskins					
Plaxico Burress	B.A.	2000	former wide receiver, Pittsburgh Steelers					
Garrett Celek	B.S.	2011	former NFL tight end, San Francisco 49ers					
Connor Cook	B.A., M.A.	2014, 2015	quarterback, Cincinnati Bengals					
Kirk Cousins	B.A.	2011	quarterback, Minnesota Vikings					
Demetrious Cox		2016	safety, Carolina Panthers					
B.J. Cunningham	B.S.	2012	wide receiver, Chicago Bears					
Kellen Davis	B.A.	2007	former NFL tight end, New York Jets					
Joe DeLamielleure	B.A.	1973	former guard, Buffalo Bills; elected to the Pro Football Hall of Fame in 2003					
Darqueze Dennard	B.A.	2014	cornerback, Cincinnati Bengals					
Tony Discenzo			former tackle, Boston Patriots and Buffalo Bills					
Kurtis Drummond	B.A.	2015	safety, Houston Texans					
T. J. Duckett	B.A.	2002	former running back, Seattle Seahawks					
Billy Joe DuPree	B.A.	1972	former NFL tight end, Dallas Cowboys					
Paul Edinger	B.S.	2000	former placekicker, Minnesota Vikings					
Dixon Edwards	B.A.	1990	former NFL linebacker, Dallas Cowboys					
Brandon Fields	B.A.	2007	former NFL punter, Miami Dolphins					
Fou Fonoti	B.A.	2014	offensive tackle, San Francisco 49ers					
Wayne Fontes	B.S.	1961	former coach, Detroit Lions					
Bennie Fowler	B.A.	2014	wide receiver, Denver Broncos					
Dan France	B.A.	2014	offensive tackle, Cincinnati Bengals					
William Gholston			defensive end, Tampa Bay Buccaneers					
Joel Heath			defensive tackle, Houston Texans					
Tyler Hoover	B.A.	2014	defensive end, Indianapolis Colts					
Brian Hoyer	B.A.	2008	quarterback, Houston Texans					
Mark Ingram	B.S.	1996	former wide receiver, Philadelphia Eagles					
Taiwan Jones	B.A.	2015	linebacker, New York Jets					
Jeremy Langford	B.A.	2015	running back, Chicago Bears					
Tony Lippett	B.A.	2015	wide receiver, Miami Dolphins					
Keshawn Martin	B.A.	2011	wide receiver, Houston Texans					
Derrick Mason	B.A.	1997	former wide receiver, Baltimore Ravens					
Brandon McKinney	B.A.	2006	former defensive tackle, Indianapolis Colts					
Jim Miller	B.S.	2002	former quarterback, New York Giants					
Earl Morrall	B.A.	1955	former quarterback, Baltimore Colts					
Muhsin Muhammad	B.A.	1996	former wide receiver, Carolina Panthers					
Keith Mumphery	B.A.	2015	wide receiver, Houston Texans					
Domata Peko			defensive tackle, Cincinnati Bengals					
Julian Peterson	B.A.	2000	former linebacker, Detroit Lions					
Javon Ringer	B.S.	2009	former running back, Tennessee Titans					
Andre Rison	B.A.	1989	former wide receiver, Oakland Raiders					
Trenton Robinson	B.A.	2011	defensive back, Washington Redskins					
Charles Rogers	B.S.	2003	former wide receiver, Detroit Lions					
Marcus Rush	B.A.	2015	linebacker, San Francisco 49ers					
George Saimes	B.S.	1963	former safety, Buffalo Bills					
Dion Sims	B.A.	2013	tight end, Miami Dolphins					
Bubba Smith	B.A.	1966	former defensive end, Baltimore Colts; actor, Police Academy	-	Jeff Smoker	B.S.	2007	former quarterback, Arizona Rattlers
Drew Stanton	B.S.	2007	quarterback, Arizona Cardinals					
Kevin Vickerson	B.A.	2005	defensive tackle, New York Jets					
Kenneth Walker III		2021	running back, Seattle Seahawks					
Trae Waynes			cornerback, Minnesota Vikings					
George Webster	B.A.	1966	former linebacker, Houston Oilers					
Tyrone Willingham	B.A.	1977	former wide receiver; head coach of Stanford, Notre Dame and Washington					
Jerel Worthy	B.A.	2012	defensive tackle, Kansas City Chiefs					

==== Golf ====
Name	Degree	Year	Comments	Reference
Emily Bastel Glaser	B.S.	2002	head coach of Florida Gators women's golf team; former LPGA Tour pro golfer	

==== Gymnastics ====
Name	Degree	Year	Comments	Reference
Stanley Tarshis			NCAA champion gymnast, horizontal bar	

==== Ice hockey ====
Name	Degree	Year	Comments	Reference
Justin Abdelkader			winger, Detroit Red Wings	
Rod Brind'Amour	B.S.	1989	right wing, Carolina Hurricanes	
Anson Carter	B.S.	1996	right wing, Carolina Hurricanes	
Adam Hall	B.S.	2002	right wing, Philadelphia Flyers	
Duncan Keith			defense, Chicago Blackhawks	
John-Michael Liles	B.S.	2003	defense, Toronto Maple Leafs	
Donald McSween	B.S.	1987	defense, Buffalo Sabres	
Drew Miller	did not graduate		left wing, Detroit Red Wings	
Kelly Miller	B.S.	1985	former left wing, Washington Capitals	
Kip Miller	B.S.	1990	former forward, Washington Capitals; 1990 Hobey Baker Award winner	
Ryan Miller	B.S.	2002	goaltender, Vancouver Canucks; 2001 Hobey Baker Award winner	
Corey Tropp			forward, Columbus Blue Jackets	

==== Running ====
Name	Degree	Year	Comments	Reference
Michael Wardian		1996	marathoner	

==== Soccer ====
Name	Degree	Year	Comments	Reference
Jordan Gruber			American-Israeli soccer player	

==== Olympians ====
Name	Degree	Year	Comments	Reference
Fred Alderman	B.S.	1927	winner of gold medal in 4×400-meter relay at the 1928 Summer Olympics	
Savatheda Fynes	B.S.		winner of gold medal in 4×100-meter freestyle relay at the 2000 Summer Olympics	
Linda Gustavson	B.A.	1972	winner of gold, silver and bronze medals in 4×100-meter freestyle relay, and 400- and 100-meter freestyle events at the 1968 Summer Olympics	
Pam Kruse	B.A., M.A., PhD	1973, 1975, 1979	winner of silver medal in 800-meter freestyle at the 1968 Summer Olympics	
Allan Kwartler	B.S.	1948	three-time Olympic saber champion	
Howard Patterson	B.A.	1950	competitor in 100-meter backstroke at the 1948 Summer Olympics	
Clarke Scholes	B.A.	1952	winner of gold medal in 100-meter freestyle at the 1952 Summer Olympics	
Ken Walsh	B.A.	1967	winner of gold medals in the 4×100-meter freestyle relay and 4×100-meter medley relay at the 1968 Summer Olympics	

==== Mixed martial arts ====
Name	Degree	Year	Comments	Reference
Rashad Evans	B.S.	2003	professional mixed martial artist; won The Ultimate Fighter 2, former UFC Light-Heavyweight Champion	
Gray Maynard		2003	three-time NCAA All-American wrestler; professional MMA fighter; former UFC Lightweight Champion	

==== Wrestling ====
Name	Degree	Year	Comments	Reference
George "The Animal" Steele	B.S.	1960	professional wrestler, school teacher, author, and actor	

== Faculty and administration ==
=== Notable faculty ===
==== Arts and humanities ====
Name	Tenure	Comments	Reference
Theophilus C. Abbot	1858–1889	professor of English literature, president, State Agricultural College	
Wes "Warmdaddy" Anderson	present	associate professor of Jazz Studies, Michigan State University	
Michael Dease	present	associate professor of Jazz Studies, Michigan State University	
Henry R. Pattengill	1886–1890	assistant professor of English	
H. Owen Reed	1939–1976	composer, conductor, music theorist	
A. J. M. Smith	1943–1972	Canadian poet and anthologist	
Diane Wakoski	retired 2011	professor of Creative Writing, Michigan State University	
Rodney Whitaker	present	director of Jazz Studies, Michigan State University	

==== Science ====
Name	Tenure	Comments	Reference
Selman Akbulut	1986–present	mathematician specializing in real algebraic geometry and 4-dimensional manifolds	
James C. Anthony	2003–present	psychopathologist	
Warren Babcock	1891–1913	professor of Mathematics; secretary of the faculty, 1898–1913; second mayor of East Lansing	
William J. Beal	1871–1910	developed hybrid corn; co-planned "Collegeville", the first subdivision in what later became East Lansing, Michigan	
Marc Breedlove	2001–present	neuroscientist specializing in steroid hormones and sexual behavior	
Cem Göknar		electrical/electronics engineer, specialising in circuit theory	
Dennis R. Heldman	1966–1984	food scientist; Institute of Food Technologists president (2006–07)	
John C. Holmes	1855–1861	horticulturalist; founder of MSU	
Richard Lenski	1991–present	microbiologist; conductor of the E. coli long-term evolution experiment	
Barry Pittendrigh	2016–present	molecular biologist	
Robert Root-Bernstein	1987–present	physiologist, author, MacArthur Fellow	
Barnett Rosenberg	1961–1997	discoverer of cisplatin	
Anatoliy Skorokhod	1993–2011	probabilist	
Horst Stöcker	1982–1985	theoretical physicist	
Walter M. Urbain	1965–1975	food scientist	

==== Social science ====
Name	Tenure	Comments	Reference
Walter Adams	1947–1992	economist, former president of Michigan State (1969)	
Mohammed Ayoob	1990–present	professor of international relations and Muslim studies	
Kent John Chabotar	1972–1975	political scientist; president, Guilford College	
Robert C. Craig	1966–1989	professor in the department of Counseling, Educational Psychology, and Special Education	
Erich Fromm	1957–1961	psychologist and philosopher	

=== Current administration ===
==== Board of trustees ====
Current trustees
Name	End of term	Position	Reference
Dianne Byrum	2025	Chair	
Dan Kelly	2025	Vice chair	
Joel Ferguson	2021		
Melanie Foster	2023		
Renee Knake Jefferson	2023		
Brian Mosallam	2021		
Brianna T. Scott	2027		
Kelly Tebay	2027		

==== Head coaches ====
Name	Tenure	Comments	Reference
J Batt	2025–present	athletic director	
Robyn Fralick	2023–present	women's basketball	
Tom Izzo	1995–present	men's basketball	
Adam Nightingale	2022–present	men's ice hockey coach	
Jonathan Smith	2024–present	men's football	

=== Former administration ===
==== Presidents ====
Name	Administration	Comments	Reference
Joseph R. Williams	1857–1859	first president of the college; lieutenant governor of Michigan	
Lewis R. Fiske	1859–1862	Methodist minister; president of Albion College	
Theophilus C. Abbot	1862–1885	professor of English literature; earned an LL.D. from the University of Michigan	
Edwin Willits	1885–1889	former principal of the State Normal School; assistant secretary of agriculture for the Cleveland administration	
Oscar Clute	1889–1893		
Lewis G. Gorton	1893–1895		
Jonathan L. Snyder	1896–1915		
Frank S. Kedzie	1915–1921		
David Friday	1922–1923		
Kenyon L. Butterfield	1924–1928		
Robert S. Shaw	1928–1941		
John A. Hannah	1941–1969	chairman of the United States Commission on Civil Rights	
Walter Adams	1969–1970		
Clifton Reginald Wharton, Jr.	1970–1978	11th United States deputy secretary of state	
Edgar L. Harden	1978–1979	president of Northern Michigan University	
M. Cecil Mackey	1979–1985	president of University of South Florida, president of Texas Tech University	
John A. DiBiaggio	1985–1992	president of the University of Connecticut, president of Tufts University	
Gordon Guyer	1992–1993	vice president for Governmental Affairs at MSU	
M. Peter McPherson	1993–2004	deputy secretary of the U.S. Department of Treasury, chairman of Dow Jones	
Lou Anna K. Simon	2004–2018	John A. Hannah Distinguished Professor in the College of Education at MSU	
John Engler	2018–2019	46th governor of Michigan	
Satish Udpa	2019–2019		
Samuel L. Stanley Jr.	2019–2022	president of Stony Brook University	
