= Douglas B. Leeds =

American businessman (1947–2011)

Douglas B. Leeds (March 15, 1947 – May 9, 2011) was an advertising/media executive who was the founder and Chairman/CEO of Storeboard Media LLC. Leeds was also known for producing two Broadway shows and serving as President of The American Theatre Wing, which founded, manages and presents The Tony Awards annually on CBS Television.

Leeds was a 1965 graduate of Worcester Academy and matriculated to Babson College. He served as a trustee for both.

== Advertising & media career (1976–2011) ==
In 2006 Doug Leeds founded Storeboard Media, an indoor billboard company which holds the exclusive right to place advertising on security pedestals at the front entrance of over 19,000 retail chain stores (CVS, Walgreens, Duane Reade, etc.) throughout the United States. The company's media reach is over one billion consumer impressions per month. Among its current advertising clients are: P&G, Colgate, Unilever, Beiersdorf, L'Oréal, Johnson & Johnson, Coca-Cola and Alberto Culver.

Before founding StoreBoard Media LLC, Leeds was president and CEO of the award-winning point-of-purchase advertising firm, Thomson-Leeds Company, Inc. and worked with clients including American Express, Sony, Philip Morris, Ford and Microsoft. In 1967 the company was acquired by Ogilvy & Mather which subsequently was purchased by WPP Group. Leeds who continued as company President/CEO led a group in 1993 to successfully purchase Thomson-Leeds Company back from WPP. The company went on to win more awards (POPAI) for designing and producing outstanding merchandising programs than any company in the world. In September 2000 Leeds sold the company to Array Market Group and continued as Chairman of the Thomson-Leeds division until 2003, when he left to create The Tori Group, Inc. In 2005 The Tori Group, along with The Jeffrey Development Group Ltd., purchased Impact Media and created StoreBoard Media LLC.

In developing numerous innovative merchandising concepts, Leeds was granted patents from the US Patent Office ranging from a retractable pen for American Express to a suction cup window display holder for Hunter Douglas Inc.

Doug Leeds was active in the industry trade association, POPAI (Point of Purchase Advertising International), serving as vice chair of its board of directors and chair of numerous committees, including its Annual Conference and Marketplace Show at Jacob Javits Convention Center. In 2002 Doug Leeds was the youngest member ever elected to the POPAI Hall of Fame. A frequent speaker at industry conferences, Leeds has published numerous articles in trade journals such as BrandWeek and Potentials In Marketing. He also authored chapters in the best-selling college textbooks on sales promotion and merchandising: The Sales Promotion Handbook, published by Darnell and contributed to McGraw-Hill's The Customer Is Always Right! As a merchandising expert, Leeds was featured in The Wall Street Journal, The New York Times and was a guest on CNBC's Money Watch and CNN's Power Lunch. Leeds also served on the corporate boards of University Home Services Inc, Auto Data Systems and C-360, Inc.

== The American Theatre Wing and other not-for-profit activities ==
Doug Leeds was an active board member of multiple not-for-profit educational, cultural and health organizations. He was known for his visible roll as President of The American Theatre Wing, which is the founder of The Tony Awards for excellence on Broadway. Leeds joined The American Theatre Wing in 1990, was elected Secretary/Treasurer in 1991 and vice-chairman in 2003. In his time with The American Theatre Wing Leeds chaired multiple committees including, Benefit, Finance, Grants, By-Laws and Strategic Planning. From 2004 to 2008 he served as president. From 2003 to 2008 he co-hosted Working In The Theatre, which is telecast on CUNY TV weekly in select markets. He also represented the organization as a member of the Tony Management Committee and the Tony Administration Committee.

In 1983, with Chappy Morris and Christine Biddle, Leeds founded and chaired (1983–1999) The Lobby Gallery Associates at The Whitney Museum of American Art, which became one of the leading young professional groups supporting a museum in the United States. The group has since been renamed The Whitney Contemporaries. In 1992 Leeds was elected trustee of the museum and chair of its membership committee.

Leeds also served as a trustee of Guild Hall of East Hampton, The Checkerboard Foundation and The Frick Council of The Frick Museum. In addition, he was a board member of Ronald McDonald House Associates and a member of The International Advisory Board of the Children's Radio Foundation and The Dream Team at Memorial Sloan-Kettering Cancer Center, which fulfills wishes of Sloan-Kettering patients and their families. Leeds was a graduate and trustee of Worcester Academy and Babson College, where he received his BS degree in 1970.
