= Nan Phinney =

American physicist (born 1945)

- Born: Nanette Cecile Phinney; 1945 (age 80–81); Chicago, Illinois, U.S.
- Education: State University of New York at Stonybrook
- Scientific career
- Workplaces: SLAC; CERN; University of Oxford
- Thesis: Trident Production in Coulomb Field (1972)
- Doctoral advisor: John (Jack) Smith, SUNY, Stonybrook

Nan Phinney (born 1945) is a retired American accelerator physicist at SLAC. She was program coordinator for the Stanford Linear Collider (SLC), the world's first linear collider. Her research interests are high energy colliders and linear colliders. She became an American Physical Society Fellow in 1993. Her last job title at SLAC was distinguished staff scientist.

== Early life and education ==
Born in Chicago in 1945, Nan Phinney is the daughter of Thomas Ward Phinney, who trained as an electrical engineer, and Martha Louise (née Lawrence) Phinney. She is a granddaughter of photographer George R. Lawrence.

The family lived on the north side of Chicago, where she attended Catholic grammar school and Catholic girls' high school.

Phinney completed a Bachelor of Science in physics and astronomy in 1966 at Michigan State University. She earned an M.S. in 1968, and a Ph.D. in 1972, both degrees in high-energy physics at the State University of New York, Stony Brook. Her dissertation was Trident Production in Coulomb Field, advised by John (Jack) Smith.

== Career ==
=== Postdoctoral positions ===
From 1972 through 1980, Phinney held post-doc positions from École Polytechnique and the University of Oxford, working at CERN on high-energy particle physics experiments. Initially she worked on the hyperon experiment on the Proton Synchrotron, but for most of her time at CERN she worked with the CERN, Columbia, Oxford, Rockefeller group in IR-1 of the Intersecting Storage Rings. The group studied wide-angle scattering, and Phinney's work was primarily data acquisition.

=== Stanford Linear Accelerator Center ===
"I thought [the linear collider] was really bold and imaginative and exciting. Anyone could build a storage ring, but this was going to be fun."

— Nan Phinney

In 1981 Phinney was one of the first physicists hired to work on the Stanford Linear Collider (SLC), the world's first linear collider. With technical expertise and leadership qualities, she became SLC program coordinator from 1990 to 1998. She led the effort "to make the accelerator perform — an enormous challenge that took constant effort", according to Burt Richter. Prof. David Burke said she "became an international spokesperson for the new technology as a result of her scientific expertise as well as her ability to talk to audiences ranging from scientists to government officials".

In 2004 Phinney was elected chair of the Division of the Physics of Beams executive committee of the American Physical Society. She has served on the second International Linear Collider Technical Review Committee as well as the U.S. Linear Collider Steering Group Accelerator Task Force and the United Kingdom Linear Collider Machine Advisory Committee. According to Richter, she has brought "her hard-won wisdom and experience on linear colliders to the worldwide linear collider design efforts".

== Awards and honors ==
- 1993 American Physical Society Fellow, cited "For her many contributions to the successful development and operation of the Stanford Linear Collider"
- 2003 Marsh O’Neill Award recipient, acknowledged for her "leadership qualities and technical ability" as program coordinator for the Stanford Linear Collider

== Selected publications ==
- Phinney, Nan (2013). "7.2 the Only Linear Collider Built so Far: The SLC". In Brüning, Oliver; Myers, Stephen (eds.). Accelerators and Colliders. Berlin, Heidelberg: Springer-Verlag Berlin Heidelberg. pp. 186–188. doi:10.1007/978-3-642-23053-0_17. ISBN 9789814436403.
- Phinney, Nan (September 20, 2012), "SLC: The first linear collider", Challenges and Goals for Accelerators in the XXI Century, World Scientific, pp. 97–101, doi:10.1142/9789814436403_0005, ISBN 978-981-4436-39-7
- Adolphsen, Chris; et al. (June 26, 2013). "The International Linear Collider Technical Design Report - Volume 3.I: Accelerator R&D in the Technical Design Phase". arXiv:1306.6353 [physics.acc-ph].
- Adolphsen, Chris; et al. (June 26, 2013). "The International Linear Collider Technical Design Report - Volume 3.II: Accelerator Baseline Design". arXiv:1306.6328 [physics.acc-ph].
- Phinney, Nan (2007). "ILC reference design report:Accelerator executive summary". ICFA Beam Dyn.Newslett.
- Phinney, Nan (2001). "Next linear collider design status". 18th International Conference on High-Energy Accelerators (HEACC 2001).
- Phinney, Nan (October 2001). "SLC final performance and lessons". Linac. Proceedings, 20th International Conference, Linac 2000, Monterey, U.S., August 21–25, 2000.: 1, 2.
- Phinney, N. (February 5, 1992). "SLC performance and plans". AIP Conference Proceedings. 272 (2): 1971–1978. Bibcode:1992AIPC..272.1971P. doi:10.1063/1.43471. ISSN 0094-243X.
- Phinney, Nan (1994). "The Heart of a new machine". SLAC Beam Line. 24N2: 2.
- Phinney, Nan (August 1992). "Review of SLC performance". Proceedings, 26th International Conference on High-energy Physics (ICHEP 92): Dallas, Texas: 1971–1978.
- Phinney, Nan (1985). "Report on the SLC Control System" (PDF). IEEE Transactions on Nuclear Science. 32 (5): 2117–2119. Bibcode:1985ITNS...32.2117P. doi:10.1109/TNS.1985.4333834.
