= Darlene Dixon =

American veterinary scientist and toxicologic pathologist

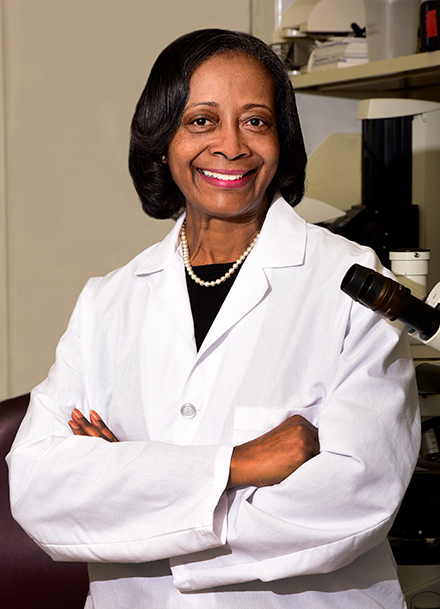
- Born: New Jersey, US
- Education: Tuskegee University; Michigan State University
- Scientific career
- Fields: Toxicologic pathology, veterinary medicine
- Workplaces: National Institute of Environmental Health Sciences

Darlene Dixon is an American veterinary scientist and toxicologic pathologist researching the pathogenesis/carcinogenesis of tumors affecting the reproductive tract of rodents and humans and assessing the role of environmental and endogenous hormonal factors in the growth of these tumors. She is a senior investigator at the National Institute of Environmental Health Sciences. Currently, she runs a research group that focuses on molecular pathogenesis.

== Education ==
Dixon was born in New Jersey. She earned a B.S. at Tuskegee University where she completed a Doctor of Veterinary Medicine (D.V.M.) degree in 1982. Dixon earned a Ph.D. in 1985 at Michigan State University. She conducted a postdoctoral fellowship at The Rockefeller University, Laboratory Animal Research Center. Dixon received her board certification from the American College of Veterinary Pathologists (ACVP) in 1987.

== Career ==
Dixon joined the National Institute of Environmental Health Sciences (NIEHS) in 1987. She works as a veterinary scientist and toxicologic pathologist. As of September 2019, she is a senior investigator in the NIEHS National Toxicology Program's Molecular Pathogenesis Group.

In 2021, Dixon was elected President-Elect of the Society of Toxicologic Pathology (STP), becoming the organization’s first woman of color to hold the position. Her election was recognized by colleagues as a reflection of her leadership and contributions to the field of toxicologic pathology.

Dixon is active in the North Carolina Women of Color Research Network (NC WoCRN). She mentors as part of the NIEHS Scholars Connect Program (NSCP), which offers a year-long apprenticeship program to students from historically black colleges and universities, as well as other area academic institutions.

She recently served as the co-chair for the National Institute of Environmental Health Sciences Workshop held in December of 2021 where she raised awareness of the issues coming from the local and regional communities. They were concerned about the legacy of contamination in North Carolina and the negative effects of concentrated animated feeding operations.

=== Research ===
Dixon’s group focuses on defining the pathogenesis/carcinogenesis of tumors affecting the reproductive tract of rodents and humans and assessing the role of environmental and endogenous hormonal factors in the growth of these tumors.

The group has used cell lines, 3D cultures, archival mouse tissue, and human clinical samples to study the influence of membrane-associated estrogen receptors and growth factors/receptors and their signaling pathways on uterine leiomyoma (fibroid) growth. Group members use leiomyoma and patient-matched myometrial samples, clinical tissues taken from cycle-staged, premenopausal women participating in the NIEHS George Washington University Fibroid Study. The rodent tissue samples are either from in-house studies or National Toxicology Program archives.

Dixon and her group seek to understand the basic molecular mechanisms of disease, which may lead to therapeutic interventions that generate alternative non-invasive treatments for clinical fibroids and other diseases affecting the female reproductive tract.

== Selected works ==
- Dixon, Darlene; He, Hong; Haseman, Joseph K. (October 2000). "Immunohistochemical Localization of Growth Factors and Their Receptors in Uterine Leiomyomas and Matched Myometrium". Environmental Health Perspectives. 108: 795–802. doi:10.2307/3454309. JSTOR 3454309. PMID 11035985.
- Couse, John F.; Dixon, Darlene; Yates, Mariana; Moore, Alicia B.; Ma, Liang; Maas, Richard; Korach, Kenneth S. (October 2001). "Estrogen Receptor-α Knockout Mice Exhibit Resistance to the Developmental Effects of Neonatal Diethylstilbestrol Exposure on the Female Reproductive Tract". Developmental Biology. 238 (2): 224–238. doi:10.1006/dbio.2001.0413. PMID 11784006.
- Flake, Gordon P; Andersen, Janet; Dixon, Darlene (June 2003). "Etiology and pathogenesis of uterine leiomyomas: a review". Environmental Health Perspectives. 111 (8): 1037–1054. doi:10.1289/ehp.5787. ISSN 0091-6765. PMC 1241553. PMID 12826476.
- Nikitin, A. Y., Alcaraz, A., Anver, M. R., Bronson, R. T., Cardiff, R. D., Dixon, D., ... & Jacks, T. (April 2004). Classification of proliferative pulmonary lesions of the mouse: recommendations of the mouse models of human cancers consortium. Cancer research, 64(7), 2307-2316. doi:10.1158/0008-5472.CAN-03-3376
- Daniely, Yaron; Liao, Grace; Dixon, Darlene; Linnoila, R. Ilona; Lori, Adriana; Randell, Scott H.; Oren, Moshe; Jetten, Anton M. (July 2004). "Critical role of p63 in the development of a normal esophageal and tracheobronchial epithelium". American Journal of Physiology. Cell Physiology. 287 (1): C171–C181. doi:10.1152/ajpcell.00226.2003. ISSN 0363-6143. PMID 15189821. S2CID 5779908.
