= Judith Hahn =

American artist

Judith Joy Schiemann Hahn (1941–1999) was an American artist. Hahn was born in Chicago, Illinois.

She earned a B.F.A. from the University of Illinois, and an M.F.A. from Michigan State University.

At the age of 41, she was diagnosed with multiple sclerosis.

Her work is included in the collections of the Seattle Art Museum, the Art Institute of Chicago, the Smithsonian American Art Museum and the Brooklyn Museum.
