= Toxicologic Pathology =

- Discipline: Toxicology, pathology
- Language: English
- Edited by: Kevin A. Keane

Publication details
- History: 1972-present
- Publisher: SAGE Publications
- Frequency: 8/year
- Impact factor: 1.5 (2022)

Standard abbreviations
- ISO 4: Toxicol. Pathol.

Indexing
- CODEN: TOPADD
- ISSN: 0192-6233 (print); 1533-1601 (web)
- LCCN: 2006215617
- OCLC no.: 45682258

Links
- Journal homepage; Online access; Online archive

Toxicologic Pathology is a peer-reviewed academic journal covering the field of toxicology, pathology, and preclinical development. The editor-in-chief is Kevin Keane employed at Blueprint Medicines, Cambridge, Massachusetts. The journal was established in 1972 and is published by SAGE Publications in association with the Society of Toxicologic Pathology, the British Society of Toxicological Pathology, and the European Society of Toxicologic Pathology.

== Abstracting and indexing ==
The journal is abstracted and indexed in Scopus and the Science Citation Index Expanded. According to the Journal Citation Reports, the journal has a 2018 impact factor of 1.382.
