= Linda C. Samuelson =

American physiologist

- Born: 1954 (age 70–71)
- Citizenship: US
- Education: Michigan State University; University of Chicago
- Partner: Joel Howell
- Scientific career
- Institutions: University of Michigan

Linda Carol Samuelson (born 1954) is an American physiologist who researches the role of stem cells in the gastrointestinal tract. She is the John A. Williams Collegiate Professor of Gastrointestinal Physiology at the University of Michigan, president of the American Physiological Society, and fellow of the American Physiological Society and the American Association for the Advancement of Science.

== Early life and education ==
Linda Carol Samuelson was born to parents Bonnie née Ruble and Roy Samuelson. She grew up in East Lansing, Michigan with three siblings. She had an early interest in science and math, and would help her high school chemistry teacher facilitate lab sessions. She attended Michigan State University for her bachelor's degree in biochemistry (1976) and the University of Chicago for her PhD in microbiology (1984) under the advisorship of Rosann Farber.

== Career ==
She worked as an assistant research scientist at the University of Michigan from 1988 to 1991, at which point she became an assistant professor in the Department of Physiology. She was promoted to associate professor in 1998 and full professor in 2003. In 2011, she became the John A. Williams Collegiate Professor of Gastrointestinal Physiology.

Samuelson researches the role of stem cells in the gastrointestinal tract. She has served on the editorial boards of several journals, including the Annual Review of Physiology, Physiological Genomics, Gastroenterology, and AJP-Gastrointestinal and Liver Physiology.

== Awards and honors ==
In 2015 she was elected as an inaugural fellow of the American Physiological Society. She was elected a fellow of the American Association for the Advancement of Science in 2019. In 2020 she became the 93rd president of the American Physiological Society.

== Personal life ==
Her interests include the opera and cycling. She is married to Joel Howell, who is also a faculty member at the University of Michigan. They met while studying at Michigan State University. They have two sons.
