= Reinhold Schmieding =

American businessman

- Born: Reinhold D. Schmieding; 1955 or 1956 (age 70–71); Michigan, U.S.
- Education: Michigan State University
- Occupation: Businessman
- Known for: Owner of Arthrex
- Title: Founder and CEO, Arthrex
- Children: 2

Reinhold D. Schmieding (born 1955/56) is an American billionaire businessman and the founder, CEO and owner of Arthrex.

== Early life ==
Schmieding was born in Michigan, the son of a dentist. His parents emigrated from Germany six months prior to his birth. He was educated at Michigan State University from 1973 to 1977. Schmieding was a member of the Delta Chi fraternity.

== Career ==
From 1981 to 1985, Schmieding worked for Med Tech International in Westport, Connecticut.

In 1981, Schmieding started a medical device company called Arthroscopy Excision Instruments Inc., which focused on an emerging procedure known as arthroscopy. The initial investment was $60,000 from Schmieding's personal savings. After starting the company, Schmieding did not make a profit for the first two years. He ran his company from his apartment in the Olympic Village.

Later, the company was renamed as Arthrex Inc.

Arthrex distributes its products to more than 90 countries worldwide. It has subsidiaries throughout Europe, including Germany, Austria, Belgium, England and France. In 1991, the headquarters shifted to Naples, Florida. Since then, the company has grown from two employees to over 2000. In 2015, Arthrex was listed at number 94 on Fortune's 100 Best Companies to Work For.

Schmieding received an honorary doctorate from Florida Gulf Coast University in 2018.

== Personal life ==
He is married with two adult children and lives in Naples, Florida.
