= Bush's Brain =

2003 book about Karl Rove

Bush's Brain: How Karl Rove Made George W. Bush Presidential
- Author: James Moore and Wayne Slater
- Language: English
- Publisher: John Wiley & Sons, Inc.
- Publication date: 2003
- ISBN: 0-471-47140-2
- OCLC: 51873453

Bush's Brain: How Karl Rove Made George W. Bush Presidential is a book by James Moore and Wayne Slater that chronicles the political career of Karl Rove and the role he has played in the elections of George W. Bush, both when running for Governor of Texas and for president. It was published in 2003 by John Wiley & Sons, Inc. ISBN 0-471-47140-2.

In 2004, a documentary film was directed and produced by Joseph Mealey and Michael Paradies Shoob with the shortened title, Bush's Brain. In that film, a series of political insiders of both major parties suggest that Karl Rove, President George W. Bush's closest advisor, has almost single-handedly shaped United States executive branch policies, since the days when George W. Bush was running for Governor of Texas. The documentary film, available on DVD (DVD release date: February 15, 2005, run time: 80 minutes), is narrated by Jacques Vroom, Jr. and contains a soundtrack featuring the music of singer-songwriter political activist, Michelle Shocked.

Moore and Slater have followed up that book, after the 2004 Presidential election, with Rove Exposed: How Bush's Brain Fooled America (2005) ISBN 0-471-78708-6.

== Film ==
Filmed and narrated in the style of a detective story, the film investigates events that occurred during election.

In one of the film's early scenes, the film contends that Karl Rove, with Republican Bill Clements as his client in a Texas gubernatorial race, contacted the FBI after finding a hidden microphone-transmitter in his office. Following the announcement of the bugging of Rove's office, Bill Clements won the election over the Democratic incumbent, Mark White.

The film was narrated by Jacques Vroom, Jr., and full details, cast and crew can be found on IMDb.

=== Reception ===
On Metacritic, the film has a score of 48, indicating "Mixed or average reviews." Peter Travers of Rolling Stone gave the film three stars out of four.

== Other works by the authors ==
=== James Moore and Wayne Slater ===
- The Architect: Karl Rove and the Dream of Absolute Power ISBN 0-307-23793-1
- Rove Exposed: How Bush's Brain Fooled America ISBN 0-471-78708-6

=== James Moore ===
- Bush's War For Reelection: Iraq, the White House, and the People ISBN 0-471-48385-0
