= Peter Schmidt (economist) =

American economist and econometrician (born 1947)

- Born: August 8, 1947 (age 79)

Academic background
- Education: Michigan State University (BA, PhD)
- Doctoral advisor: Jan Kmenta

Academic work
- Discipline: Econometrics
- Institutions: Michigan State University

Peter Schmidt (born August 8, 1947) is an American economist and econometrician. He holds a university Distinguished Professor position at Michigan State University in East Lansing, Michigan. Schmidt is considered a foundational scholar in econometrics, having authored an early textbook in the field as well as over 150 peer-reviewed articles. In addition, Schmidt has been recognized for his excellence in teaching, with one economist stating that "a top twenty economics department could be started up from" the students he has mentored.

== Academic career ==
Schmidt received his PhD in economics at Michigan State University in 1970. Following his PhD, Schmidt worked as an assistant professor at the University of North Carolina at Chapel Hill before receiving tenure there in 1974. Schmidt returned to Michigan State in 1977 as a full professor and was named University Distinguished Professor in 1997.

Schmidt is the author of a foundational textbook, Econometrics (1976), as well as three other books and over 150 academic articles. Takeshi Amemiya has argued that Schmidt's 1977 paper on stochastic frontier models with Dennis Aigner and Knox Lovell is one of the most influential papers ever published in the Journal of Econometrics. This and several other works show up on the Federal Reserve Bank of St. Louis's list of most-cited economics articles of all time. His 2013 paper with Seung Ahn and Young Lee on panel data models is recognized as one of the most cited papers published since 2012 in the Journal of Econometrics.

== Honor and recognition ==
Schmidt has been honored for his academic and teaching contributions to the field of econometrics. In 2014, Schmidt was honored by the publication of a collection of his students' works in Festschrift in Honor of Peter Schmidt following a 2011 "Conference in Honor of Peter Schmidt." The academic journal Econometric Reviews dedicated a special issue to Schmidt in 2016, citing his "foundational and constructive role in the development of the field of econometrics."
