= Molly Fletcher =

American author and Motivational Speaker

- Born: September 20, 1971 (age 52); East Lansing, Michigan, US
- Education: Michigan State University
- Occupations: Motivational speaker, author, sports agent

Molly Fletcher (born September 20, 1971) is an entrepreneur, motivational speaker and former sports agent. She is the founder of the Molly Fletcher Company, based in Atlanta, Georgia.

== Early life and education ==
Molly Fletcher was born on September 20, 1971, in East Lansing, Michigan. She graduated from Michigan State University in 1993 with a B.A. in communications. She competed on the varsity tennis team from 1989 to 1993, captaining the team as a senior.

Fletcher moved to Atlanta shortly after graduation. She negotiated her first contract by arranging to teach tennis lessons at a luxury Atlanta apartment complex in exchange for free rent. Following a stint with Intellimedia Sports, Inc., a division of ESPN, Fletcher worked on the Super Bowl XXVIII Host Committee and then CSE.

== Career ==
Described as the "female Jerry Maguire" by CNN and ESPN, Fletcher has recruited and represented athletes, coaches and broadcasters, including Tom Izzo, Ernie Johnson Jr., Matt Kuchar, Doc Rivers, John Smoltz, Erin Andrews, Billy Donovan, and Joe Theismann.

== Works ==
Fletcher is the author of the following books:

- Fletcher, Molly (2014). A Winner's Guide to Negotiating: How Conversation Gets Deals Done. New York: McGraw-Hill Education. ISBN 978-0-71838-783-9.
- Fletcher, Molly (2013). The 5 Best Tools To Find Your Dream Career. Franklin: Carpenters Son Publishing. ISBN 978-1940262048.
- Fletcher, Molly (2011). The Business of Being the Best: Inside the World of Go-Getters and Game Changers. New York: Jossey-Bass. ISBN 978-1118060100.
- Fletcher, Molly (2017). Fearless at Work. New York: McGraw-Hill. ISBN 978-1259862984.
- Fletcher, Molly (2020). The Energy Clock: 3 Simple Steps to Create a Life Full of ENERGY - and Live Your Best Every Day. Simple Truths. ISBN 978-1492691501.

== Personal life ==
Fletcher is married with three daughters, including twins. She resides in Atlanta, Georgia with her family.
