= Thomas D. Sharkey =

Biochemist studying gas exchange in plants

Thomas "Tom" D. Sharkey
- Awards: University Distinguished Professor; Fellow of the American Association for the Advancement of Science; Fellow of American Society of Plant Biologists
- Scientific career
- Institutions: Michigan State University; Australian National University; University of Wisconsin-Madison
- Thesis: Stomatal Responses to Light in Xanthium strumarium and other species
- Doctoral advisor: Klaus Raschke
- Website: bmb.natsci.msu.edu/faculty/thomas-d-sharkey/

Thomas D. Sharkey is an American plant biochemist who studies gas exchange between plants and the atmosphere. His research has covered (1) carbon metabolism of photosynthesis from carbon dioxide uptake to carbon export from the Calvin-Benson Cycle, (2) isoprene emission from plants, and (3) abiotic stress tolerance. Four guiding questions are: (1) how leaf photosynthesis affects plant yield, (2) does some carbon fixation follow an oxidative pathway that reduces sugar output but stabilizes photosynthesis, (3) why plants make isoprene, and (4) how plants cope with high temperature.

== Education and Training ==
Tom Sharkey obtained a BS degree in 1974 from Lyman Briggs College, a residential college within Michigan State University (MSU) focusing on the study of natural science and the history and philosophy of science. He obtained his PhD in 1980 from the Department of Botany and Plant Pathology (now Plant Biology) at MSU for research conducted in the MSU-DOE Plant Research Laboratory. His thesis work was carried out under the direction of Professor Klaus Raschke and was titled Stomatal Responses to Light in Xanthium strumarium and Other Species.

== Professional Experience ==
After 2.5 years as a Post-doctoral Fellow in the Department of Environmental Biology at the Australian National University under the supervision of Professor Graham Farquhar, Sharkey spent five years (1982-1987) at the Desert Research Institute in Reno, Nevada. There he carried out experiments with the noted plant physiologist Professor Frits Went. He then went to the University of Wisconsin-Madison for 20 years where he held various administrative posts such as Chair of the Department of Botany, Director of the UW-Madison Biotron, and Director of the Institute for Cross College Biology Education. In 2008 Sharkey was recruited back to Michigan State University to become Chair of the Department of Biochemistry and Molecular Biology. In 2015 he was named a University Distinguished Professor.

Sharkey has been Series Editor for the book series Advances in Photosynthesis and Respiration and Senior Editor for the journal Plant, Cell & Environment. He was elected Fellow of the American Society of Plant Biologists in 2007 and Fellow of the American Association for the Advancement of Science in 2011.

== Research ==
Sharkey studies the biochemistry and biophysics that underlie plant-atmosphere interactions especially photosynthesis and isoprene emission from plants. Significant accomplishments related to photosynthesis include the measurement of carbon dioxide concentration inside leaves, measurement of the biophysical resistance to carbon dioxide diffusion within leaves, elucidation of the biochemical feedback chain that explains how limitations in starch and sucrose synthesis reduce the efficiency of photosynthesis and demonstration that maltose is the primary metabolite exported from chloroplasts at night.

Significant accomplishments related to isoprene biosynthesis and emissions from plants include the first genomic sequence of an isoprene synthase, cloning isoprene synthases from ten different plant species, analysis of the evolution of isoprene synthases and enzymes needed to make the precursor to isoprene.

Heat stress was shown to be ameliorated by cyclic electron flow in photosynthesis.
