= Jay Robert McColl =

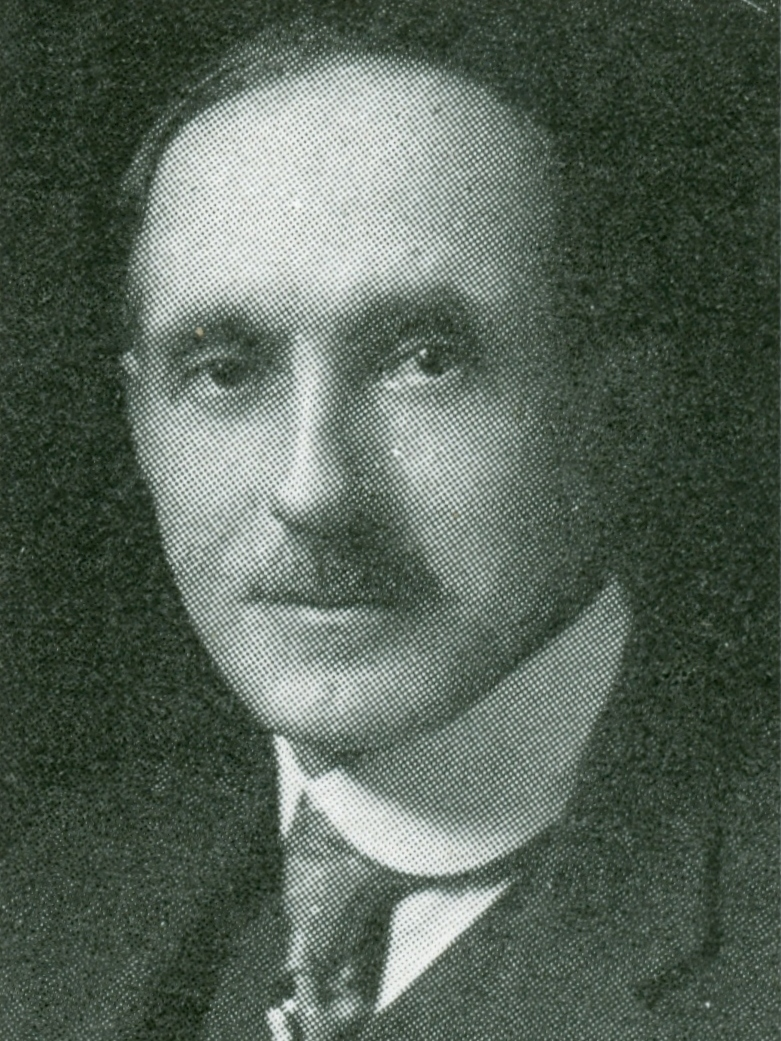
McColl circa 1927

Jay Robert McColl (March 24, 1867 – 1936) was the dean of Engineering for University of Detroit starting in 1911. A Detroit elementary school is named after him.

== Biography ==
The son of Robert McColl, he received his general education at Ann Arbor High School and graduated in 1890 from Michigan State Agricultural College (now Michigan State University) in East Lansing, Michigan. He was appointed to the U.S. Geological Survey in 1890 but did not accept this post. Instead, he took special post-graduate courses at Michigan State Agricultural College and Cornell University.

He became an adjutant professor at the University of Tennessee, 1890-1902. In 1902 he became an associate professor of thermodynamics at Purdue University and then an associate professor in steam engineer, where he was in charge of Purdue's department of steam engineering, 1903-1905. The Detroit-based American Blower Company hired McColl as a mechanical engineer in 1905. He became a consultant engineer for the firm of Ammerman, McColl & Anderson in 1910 with an office in Detroit's Penobscot Building. In 1911, he became the dean of engineering at the University of Detroit, and in 1922 he was appointed to the Michigan State Board of Agriculture.

He was a member of the American Society of Mechanical Engineers (SME), American Society for Promotion of Engineering Education and the Detroit Athletic Club.

=== Marriage and children ===
McColl married Belle G. Baldwin on January 3, 1900. They had one daughter, Jeanette Baldwin.

=== Death and afterward ===
Jay Robert McColl died in 1936. He is buried in Mount Rest Cemetery in St. Johns, Michigan.
