= Patricia Hunt =

American molecular biologist

Patricia A. Hunt is Meyer Distinguished Professor in the School of Molecular Bioscience at Washington State University. Her primary research interest lies in human aneuploidy, mammalian germ cells and meiosis. She is best known for showing the adversary effect of Bisphenol A (a common substance in plastics) on the reproductive system of mammalians. In 2018, her team discovered that replacement Bisphenols (BPS, BPF, BPAF, Diphenyl sulfone) also affects reproductive health, and this over generations.

== Career ==
Patricia Hunt did her undergraduate studies at Michigan State University. She graduated in 1983 from the University of Hawaii with a thesis on reproductive biology under the supervision of Patricia Jacobs. She completed a two-year Postdoc with Paul Burgoyne at the MRC Mammalian Development Unit and a one-year Postdoc with Eva Eicher at the Jackson Laboratory. She began her tenure track with a faculty position at Emory University from 1988 to 1992, then moved to Case Western Reserve University.

In 2005, she moved to Washington State University where she is now a Meyer Distinguished Professor in the School of Molecular Biosciences. Her current work centers on the reproductive effects of exposure to chemicals with estrogenic activity.
