= Jennifer Juengel =

Animal science researcher in New Zealand

Jenny Juengel FRSNZ
- Born: Jennifer Lee Juengel

Academic background
- Education: University of Missouri
- Thesis: Mechanisms of luteal regression in cattle (1992)

Academic work
- Discipline: Animal health
- Institutions: AgResearch

Jennifer Lee Juengel FRSNZ is an animal health researcher in New Zealand. She has been a Fellow of the Royal Society Te Apārangi since 2016.

== Early life and education ==
Juengel grew up in Michigan, and attended Michigan State University. Juengel earned a PhD from the University of Missouri in 1992, with a thesis titled Mechanisms of luteal regression in cattle after which she completed a postdoctoral research post at Colorado State University.

== Work ==
Juengel works on the reproductive genetics of sheep. Juengel was appointed to AgResearch in 1998.

Juengel is principal scientist of AgResearch's reproduction team at the Invermay campus.

== Awards and honours ==
Juengel was elected a Fellow of the Royal Society Te Apārangi in 2016.

== Selected publications ==
- S M Galloway; McNatty, Kenneth Patrick; L M Cambridge; et al. (2000). "Mutations in an oocyte-derived growth factor gene (BMP15) cause increased ovulation rate and infertility in a dosage-sensitive manner". Nature Genetics. 25 (3): 279–83. doi:10.1038/77033. PMID 10888873. Wikidata Q28140406.
- Niswender GD; Juengel, Jennifer Lee; Silva PJ; Rollyson MK; McIntush EW (2000). "Mechanisms controlling the function and life span of the corpus luteum". Physiological Reviews. 80 (1): 1–29. doi:10.1152/physrev.2000.80.1.1. PMID 10617764. Wikidata Q33807187.
- T Wilson; X Y Wu; Juengel, Jennifer Lee; et al. (2001). "Highly prolific Booroola sheep have a mutation in the intracellular kinase domain of bone morphogenetic protein IB receptor (ALK-6) that is expressed in both oocytes and granulosa cells". Biology of Reproduction. 64 (4): 1225–1235. doi:10.1095/biolreprod64.4.1225. PMID 11259271. Wikidata Q43547989.
- Juengel, Jennifer Lee; McNatty, Kenneth Patrick (2005). "The role of proteins of the transforming growth factor-beta superfamily in the intraovarian regulation of follicular development". Human Reproduction Update. 11 (2): 143–160. doi:10.1093/humupd/dmh061. PMID 15705960. Wikidata Q36038023.
- Juengel, Jennifer Lee; Hudson, Norma; Derek A Heath; Smith, Peter; Reader, Karen Lee; Steve B Lawrence; O'Connell, Anne; Mika P E Laitinen; Mark Cranfield; Groome, Nigel; Olli Ritvos; Kenneth P McNatty (2002). "Growth differentiation factor 9 and bone morphogenetic protein 15 are essential for ovarian follicular development in sheep". Biology of Reproduction. 67 (6): 1777–1789. doi:10.1095/biolreprod.102.007146. PMID 12444053. Wikidata Q44223816.
- Heywood R Sawyer; Peter Smith; Derek A Heath; Juengel, Jennifer Lee; St John Wakefield; McNatty, Kenneth Patrick (2002). "Formation of ovarian follicles during fetal development in sheep". Biology of Reproduction. 66 (4): 1134–50. doi:10.1095/biolreprod66.4.1134. PMID 11906935. Wikidata Q28208506.
