= Erik Qualman =

American writer

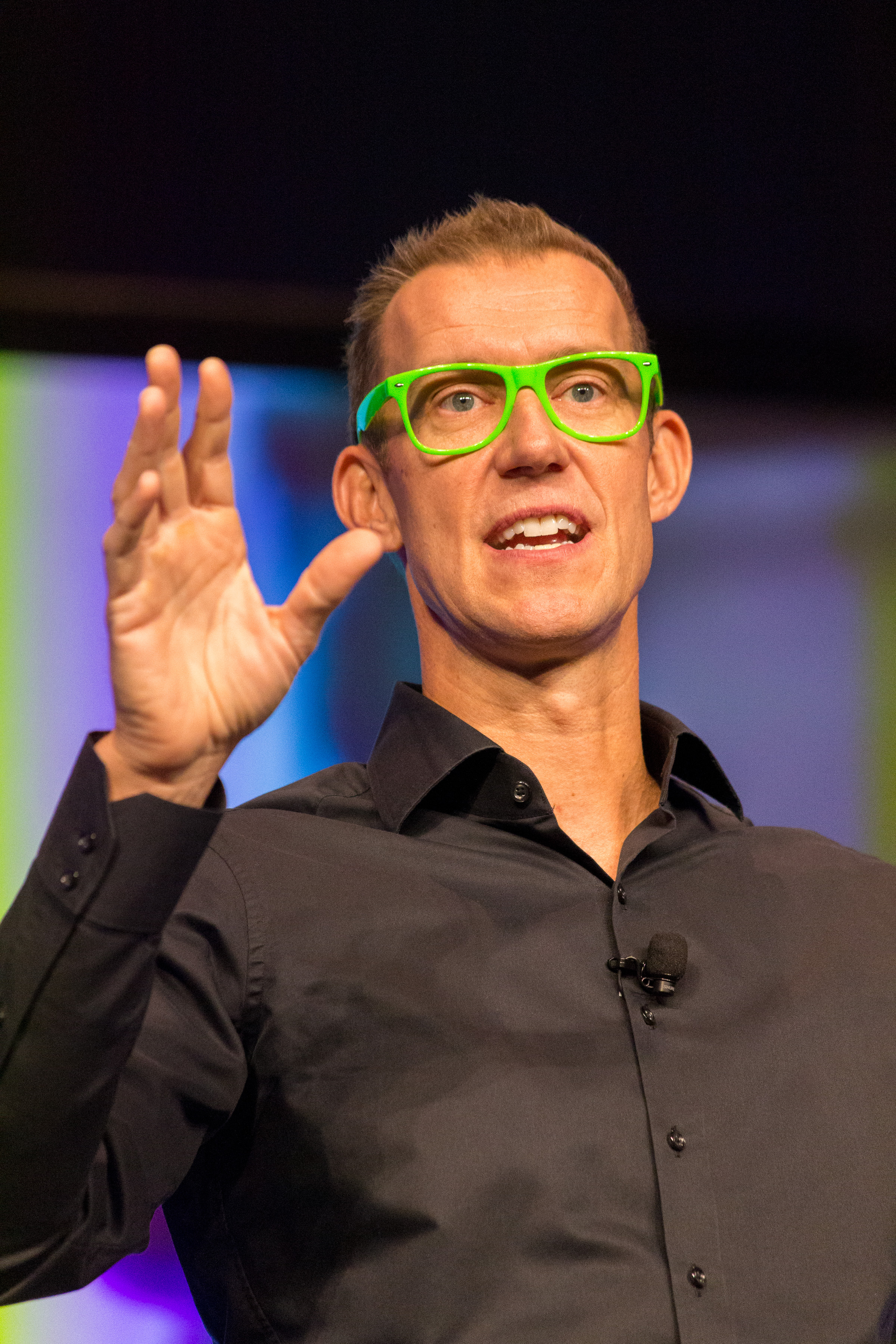
- Qualman in 2019
- Born: Detroit, Michigan, U.S.
- Occupations: Author, keynote speaker, professor
- Website: www.equalman.com

Erik Qualman is an American author. His books include Socialnomics, Digital Leader, What Happens in Vegas Stays on YouTube, and The Focus Project.

Socialnomics is held in over 1,500 libraries, and it was the American Marketing Association's 2010 Book of the Year finalist. In 2012, he was a finalist for the "Most Likeable Author Award" alongside Seth Godin and JK Rowling. Qualman is also a professional keynote speaker, and currently teaches a master's-level Digital Leadership course at Northwestern University's Medill School of Journalism, Media & Integrated Marketing Communications in Chicago, Illinois.

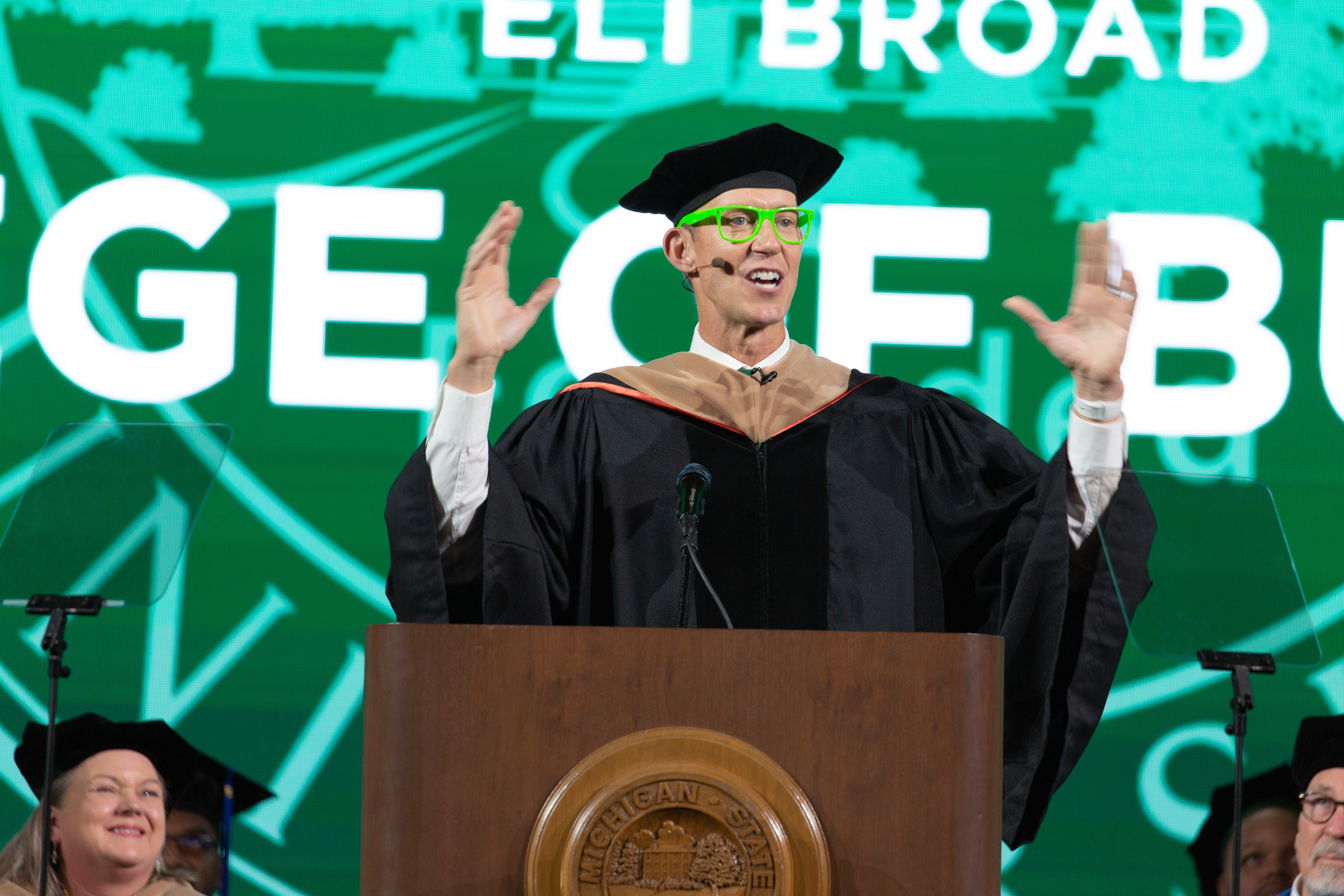
Qualman delivering commencement speech at Michigan State University

== Biography ==
Qualman is from Rochester Hills, Michigan, and received a BA in marketing from Michigan State University.

He also holds an MBA from the University of Texas' McCombs School of Business.

== Career ==
Prior to his writing and speaking career, Qualman worked in online marketing and eBusiness functions at Cadillac & Pontiac (1994–1997), AT&T (1998–2000), Yahoo (2000–2003), EarthLink (2003–2005), and Travelzoo (2005–2008). He has also taught courses at the Hult International Business School in Cambridge, Massachusetts.

Qualman was a featured speaker at BookExpo America 2009, presenting to those in attendance on how social media is transforming the way people live and do business. He delivered the keynote address at IBM's 2013 Business Connect in Milan, Italy. He was the keynote speaker at Europe's Fiber To The Home (FTTH) Council Meeting in Lisbon. In 2021, Qualman became the first male speaker to address the audience at the Indy Women in Tech Summit.

Qualman has been written about in Mashable, BusinessWeek, The New York Times, Forbes, and The Huffington Post. He has also been interviewed on radio and television, where he discussed his view on digital trends.

== Awards and recognition ==
Qualman gave the commencement address at Michigan State University on May 6, 2023. He also delivered the commencement address to the McCombs graduating class of 2011.

Lake Superior State University awarded Qualman an honorary doctorate for his work and accomplishments in the field of digital leadership.

- Top 20 Business Keynote Speaker (AAE)
- Top 25 Communications Professors on Twitter (Stukent)
- Top 50 Social Media Influencer (Forbes)

== Books ==
- Socialnomics
- Digital Leader
- What Happens in Vegas Stays on YouTube
- What Happens on Campus Stays on YouTube
- The Focus Project
