= Connel Fullenkamp =

American economist

- Born: May 26, 1965 (age 61)
- Education: Harvard University; Michigan State University
- Scientific career
- Fields: Economics; Finance
- Workplaces: Duke University; University of Notre Dame

Connel Fullenkamp (born May 26, 1965) is an economist and the director of undergraduate studies and professor of the practice in economics at Duke University, where he teaches core economics and financial economics courses. In addition to his work at Duke University, he consults for the IMF Institute for Capacity Development at the International Monetary Fund. As a member of the IMF's finance team, he trains government officials and central bankers in financial market regulation, with a focus on derivatives and emerging financial instruments. He has also collaborated with The Great Courses to produce several lecture series on economics and investing and consults for The New York Times as a faculty contributor to the NYT in Education courses in microeconomics and macroeconomics.

== Biography ==
Born to a Jewish family in 1965, Fullenkamp earned a B.A. in economics at Michigan State University (1987), an M.A. in economics at Harvard University (1989), and a Ph.D. in economics at Harvard University (1992). He was named a Harry S. Truman Scholar in 1985. Fullenkamp has been published in The Cato Journal, the Journal of Banking and Finance, the Review of Economic Dynamics, and the Review of Economics and Statistics. In 1998, Fullenkamp received the University of Notre Dame's Mendoza College of Business Outstanding Teacher Award. In 2004–2005, he was honored with the Duke University's Alumni Distinguished Undergraduate Teaching Award, and in 2012 was awarded the ICFR-Financial Times Research Prize for his paper on international financial regulation.

== See also ==
- List of economists
