= Eldon Leroy Foltz =

- Born: Eldon Leroy Foltz; March 28, 1919; Fort Collins, Colorado, United States
- Died: August 10, 2013 (aged 94)
- Education: Michigan State University; University of Michigan
- Occupations: Surgeon; Neurosurgeon
- Spouse: Katherine Crosby
- Children: Sally Foltz; James Nancy Foltz; Janis Foltz; Suzanne Foltz; Patty Foltz

Eldon Leroy Foltz (March 28, 1919 - August 10, 2013) was an American academic and neurosurgeon.

== Early life and education ==
Foltz was born in Fort Collins, Colorado, Eldon L. Foltz grew up in East Lansing, Michigan. His father was a professor of Electrical Engineering at Michigan State University In 1941 Foltz graduated from Michigan State University (B.S., Magna Cum Laude). He went on to the University of Michigan Medical School in 1943 (M.D.), doing a combined scholar program with Michigan State.

Having graduated from medical school and done a surgical internship at the University of Michigan, Foltz joined the United States Navy Corps. He served for 30 months of active duty in the South Pacific.

Next Foltz did a year of general surgery residency at the University of Michigan and became a graduate student in neuroanatomy and neuropathology. His residency in neurosurgery was at Dartmouth Medical School, where he studied under Henry Heyl. In 1950 he finished residency at the University of Louisville, where he had studied with Dr. Glen Spurling.

In order to study the limbic system Foltz became a post-doctoral fellow at The National Institute of Mental Health.

== Career ==
Foltz's initial research concerned "coma of head injury." He studied monkeys with electrodes implanted in the reticular system and also cortical electrodes. He used evoked responses to demonstrate a selective depression of electrical activity in the reticular formation by the cerebral concussion, with minimal effect on primary ascending sensory pathways. The effect was reversed (in part) by atropine therapy.

"Psychosomatic disease states in monkeys and the limbic system" was the result of Foltz's investigation of chaired "executive" monkeys. They were trained to conditioned avoidance and "conditioned stress," and monitored as to agitate states by the degree of lever pulling and the effect on intestinal motility (direct contraction measurements). The study proved that cingulotomy reduced the agitated responses, thus modifying lever pulling to an efficient level and reducing the increased gut motility.

While overseeing the pediatric neurosurgical service at Children’s Hospital in Seattle, Washington, Foltz developed a professional focus on pediatric neurosurgery. He also established a long-term research and clinical interest in hydrocephalus, which remained a central area of his work throughout his career.

== Accomplishments and awards ==
At the University of Washington, Foltz received a John R. and Mary Markle scholarship in Medical Science to support his coma and cingulum studies. During that time he became committed to academic neurosurgery. In 1965, Foltz He became a full Professor in Neurological Surgery at the university.

Foltz developed selective frontal leuotomy cingulotomy at the university, working with Dr. Arthur Ward.

In 1969, Foltz became Chairman of Neurosurgery at the University of California, Irvine. There he did experimental work in hydrocephalus, his emphasis being on CSF molecular transport studies in dogs and cats. Foltz trained twenty neurosurgeons under the program.

Foltz held offices in the Western Neurosurgical Society, Society of Neurological Surgeons, Neurosurgical Society of America, and Society of Neurological Surgeons of Orange County. He became Emeritus Professor of Neurological Surgery in 1989.

== Miscellany ==
After graduating from Medical School in 1943, Foltz married Katherine Crosby, a University of Michigan microbiologist. Foltz was fond of sailboat racing, backpacking, photography, classical music, and opera. He had five children, five grandchildren, and one great-grandchild.

== Publications ==
- Steers, E; Foltz, El; Graves, Bs (1959). "An inocula replicating apparatus for routine testing of bacterial susceptibility to antibiotics". Antibiotics & Chemotherapy (Northfield, Ill.). 9 (5): 307–311. ISSN 0570-3123. PMID 24545214.
- Hendlin, D.; Stapley, E. O.; Jackson, M.; Wallick, H.; Miller, A. K.; Wolf, F. J.; Miller, T. W.; Chaiet, L.; Kahan, F. M.; Foltz, E. L.; Woodruff, H. B.; Mata, J. M.; Hernandez, S.; Mochales, S. (3 Oct 1969). "Phosphonomycin, a New Antibiotic Produced by Strains of Streptomyces". Science. 166 (3901): 122–123. Bibcode:1969Sci...166..122H. doi:10.1126/science.166.3901.122. ISSN 0036-8075. PMID 5809587. S2CID 9223475.
- Foltz, Eldon L.; White, Lowell E. (1962). "Pain "Relief" by Frontal Cingulumotomy". Journal of Neurosurgery. 19 (2). Journal of Neurosurgery Publishing Group (JNSPG): 89–100. doi:10.3171/jns.1962.19.2.0089. ISSN 0022-3085. PMID 13893868.
- Foltz, Eldon L.; Ward, Arthur A. (1956). "Communicating Hydrocephalus from Subarachnoid Bleeding". Journal of Neurosurgery. 13 (6). Journal of Neurosurgery Publishing Group (JNSPG): 546–566. doi:10.3171/jns.1956.13.6.0546. ISSN 0022-3085. PMID 13377208.
- Pudenz, Robert H.; Foltz, Eldon L. (1 Feb 1991). "Hydrocephalus: Overdrainage by ventricular shunts. A review and recommendations". Surgical Neurology. 35 (3): 200–212. doi:10.1016/0090-3019(91)90072-H. ISSN 0090-3019. PMID 1996449.
- Foltz, Eldon L.; Shurtleff, David B. (1963). "Five-Year Comparative Study of Hydrocephalus in Children With and Without Operation (113 Cases)". Journal of Neurosurgery. 20 (12). Journal of Neurosurgery Publishing Group (JNSPG): 1064–1079. doi:10.3171/jns.1963.20.12.1064. ISSN 0022-3085. PMID 14186108.
- Foltz, Eldon L.; Shurtleff, David B. (1966). "Conversion of Communicating Hydrocephalus to Stenosis or Occlusion of the Aqueduct during Ventricular Shunt". Journal of Neurosurgery. 24 (2). Journal of Neurosurgery Publishing Group (JNSPG): 520–529. doi:10.3171/jns.1966.24.2.0520. ISSN 0022-3085. PMID 5295917.
- Shurtleff, David B.; Foltz, Eldon L.; Weeks, Robert D.; Loeser, John (1 Dec 1973). "Therapy of staphylococcus epidermidis: Infections associated with cerebrospinal fluid shunts". Pediatrics. 53 (1): 55–62. doi:10.1542/peds.53.1.55. ISSN 0031-4005. PMID 4809195. S2CID 43112908.
- Shurtleff, David B.; Christie, Dennis; Foltz, Eldon L. (1971). "Ventriculoauriculostomy-associated infection". Journal of Neurosurgery. 35 (6). Journal of Neurosurgery Publishing Group (JNSPG): 686–694. doi:10.3171/jns.1971.35.6.0686. ISSN 0022-3085. PMID 5117222.
- Foltz, Eldon L.; Schmidt, Richard P. (1956). "The Role of the Reticular Formation in the Coma of Head Injury". Journal of Neurosurgery. 13 (2). Journal of Neurosurgery Publishing Group (JNSPG): 145–154. doi:10.3171/jns.1956.13.2.0145. ISSN 0022-3085. PMID 13307290.
- Shurtleff, David B.; Foltz, Eldon L.; Loeser, John D. (1 Apr 1973). "Hydrocephalus". American Journal of Diseases of Children. 125 (5): 688–693. doi:10.1001/archpedi.1973.04160050042008. ISSN 0002-922X. PMID 4699501.
- Foltz, Eldon L.; Aine, Cheryl (1 Mar 1981). "Diagnosis of hydrocephalus by CSF pulse-wave analysis: A clinical study". Surgical Neurology. 15 (4): 283–293. doi:10.1016/S0090-3019(81)80009-2. ISSN 0090-3019. PMID 7245015.
- Foltz, Eldon L.; Knopp, Lawrence M.; Ward, Arthur A. (1959). "Experimental Spasmodic Torticollis". Journal of Neurosurgery. 16 (1). Journal of Neurosurgery Publishing Group (JNSPG): 55–72. doi:10.3171/jns.1959.16.1.0055. ISSN 0022-3085. PMID 13621265.
- Foltz, Eldon L.; Blanks, Jeff P. (1988). "Symptomatic low intracranial pressure in shunted hydrocephalus". Journal of Neurosurgery. 68 (3). Journal of Neurosurgery Publishing Group (JNSPG): 401–408. doi:10.3171/jns.1988.68.3.0401. ISSN 0022-3085. PMID 3343612.
- Foltz, Eldon L.; Thomas, L. B.; Ward, A. A. (1952). "The Effects of Intracarotid Diodrast". Journal of Neurosurgery. 9 (1). Journal of Neurosurgery Publishing Group (JNSPG): 68–82. doi:10.3171/jns.1952.9.1.0068. ISSN 0022-3085. PMID 14908639.
- Kwan, K C; Foltz, E L; Breault, G O; Baer, J E; Totaro, J A (1 Jul 1976). "Pharmacokinetics of methyldopa in man". Journal of Pharmacology and Experimental Therapeutics. 198 (2): 264–277. ISSN 0022-3565. PMID 781212.
- Kwan, K.C.; Wadke, D.A.; Foltz, E.L. (1971). "Pharmacokinetics of Phosphonomycin in Man I:Intravenous Administration". Journal of Pharmaceutical Sciences. 60 (5). Elsevier BV: 678–685. doi:10.1002/jps.2600600504. ISSN 0022-3549. PMID 5125763.
- Foltz, Eldon L.; DeFeo, Don R. (1 Nov 1980). "Double Compartment Hydrocephalus—a New Clinical Entity". Neurosurgery. 7 (6): 551–559. doi:10.1227/00006123-198012000-00002. ISSN 0148-396X. PMID 7010195.
- Eckenhoff, J. E.; Hafkenschiel, J. H.; Foltz, E. L.; Driver, R. L. (29 Feb 1948). "Influence of Hypotension on Coronary Blood Flow, Cardiac Work and Cardiac Efficiency". American Journal of Physiology. Legacy Content. 152 (3). American Physiological Society: 545–553. doi:10.1152/ajplegacy.1948.152.3.545. ISSN 0002-9513. PMID 18863152.
- Shurtleff, David B.; Kronmal, Richard; Foltz, Eldon L. (1975). "Follow-up comparison of hydrocephalus with and without myelomeningocele". Journal of Neurosurgery. 42 (1). Journal of Neurosurgery Publishing Group (JNSPG): 61–68. doi:10.3171/jns.1975.42.1.0061. ISSN 0022-3085. PMID 1089137.
- Foltz, Eldon L.; Jenkner, Fritz L.; Ward, Arthur A. (1953). "Experimental Cerebral Concussion". Journal of Neurosurgery. 10 (4). Journal of Neurosurgery Publishing Group (JNSPG): 342–352. doi:10.3171/jns.1953.10.4.0342. ISSN 0022-3085. PMID 13070057. S2CID 19880571.
