= Doug Leeds =

American businessperson

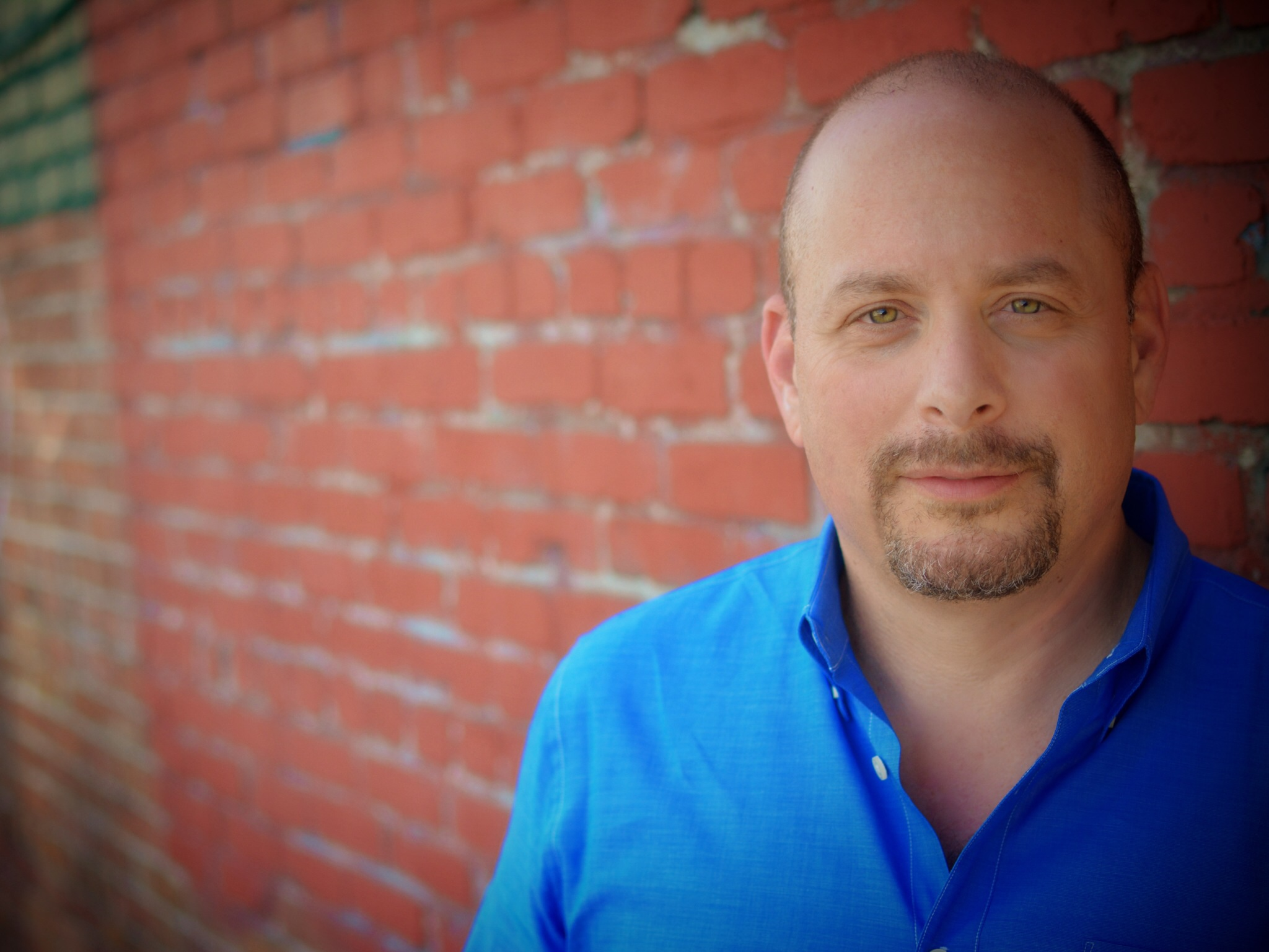
- Leeds in 2014
- Born: May 16, 1968 (age 58); Los Angeles, California, U.S.
- Occupation: CEO
- Spouse: Tracy Leeds
- Children: 3

Doug Leeds (born 16 May 1968), was the Chief Executive Officer of IAC Publishing, a digital media operating group launched on December 9, 2015, by media and Internet conglomerate IAC. The single digital media publisher reaches 100 million monthly uniques according to comScore October 2015 numbers and includes publishing brands About.com, The Daily Beast, Investopedia and Dictionary.com. Digital publishing is one of four key areas of strategic focus for IAC, as Leeds noted to the WSJ, saying that "bringing the sites under one umbrella will allow IAC to combine their strengths". Leeds previously held the title of Ask.com CEO since 2010.

== Biography ==
=== Career at Ask.com ===
Leeds was named CEO of Ask.com in 2010 following his tenure as president of the company. The previous CEO of Ask.com was Jim Safka. Under Leeds's helm, Ask.com returned to its roots as a Q&A service, redesigned its site and launched an online community to generate human-powered answers to supplement answers that are indexed from across the web. Leeds also focused the company on reaching mobile users, launching Ask.com mobile applications for web, iPhone and Android as well as several well-received stand-alone applications that spun out of the Ask.com flagship experience. Ask.com mobile apps have been downloaded over one million times.

With the Ask.com product re-focused on Q&A, Leeds returned the brand to the TV airways, inking partnerships with Live with Kelly and Mark and airing new TV commercials that highlighted the Q&A value proposition. The result of this product and marketing coordination has been greater than 25% user growth in the past year as well as a tripling of revenue and 700% increase in annual profits under Leeds's leadership. IAC (company) CEO Greg Blatt stated about Leeds's management that "for the first time, maybe since we bought it, I think Ask is really hitting a stride".

Leeds has been a leading advocate of "Applied Improv" as a business tool to foster creativity and innovation. Under Leeds's direction, all Ask.com employees have been trained in using improv techniques to enhance their communications, identify new opportunities and accept a more diverse set of business possibilities.

Prior to assuming the top role at Ask, Leeds served as the company's chief operating officer, chief strategy officer, and SVP of Products where the products he launched won multiple Webby Awards and were heralded as the "Apple of search" by Chris Sherman of Search Engine Land.

In addition to running Ask.com, Leeds now also oversees a publishing network of informational, evergreen content aimed at helping people learn new things and includes About.com, Investopedia, Ask.com, Dictionary.com.

=== IAC Publishing ===
Doug Leeds was the founder and CEO of IAC Publishing, a digital media division formed by Barry Diller’s IAC in December 2015. The new group brought together several of IAC’s key digital media properties—including About.com, Investopedia, Dictionary.com, and The Daily Beast—to form one of the world’s largest and most profitable digital publishers, reaching over 100 million monthly U.S. users.

Upon taking leadership of the newly created IAC Publishing, Leeds initiated a significant transformation strategy aimed at creating trusted vertical brands. He advocated for breaking up About.com’s general-interest model into narrowly focused media properties with strong consumer identities, aligned to specific advertiser categories. “The future of publishing is strong brands in vertical categories,” Leeds said.

To execute that strategy, Leeds hired Neil Vogel in 2013 to lead the turnaround of About.com. Vogel was best known as the founder of the Webby Awards and CEO of Recognition Media. He was tasked with modernizing About.com’s design, promoting its expert contributors, and ultimately helping reimagine the brand.

Under Leeds and Vogel’s direction, IAC Publishing launched new vertical brands such as Verywell (health), The Balance (personal finance), Lifewire (technology), The Spruce (home), and ThoughtCo (education). These sites reused curated and updated content from About.com, repackaged with distinct branding and targeted user experiences. Vogel later explained that About.com was still profitable, but that it had to be dismantled to adapt to changing internet consumption and algorithms that favored niche expertise over generalism.

In 2017, this transformation culminated in the retirement of the About.com brand and the launch of Dotdash—a name meant to evoke both digital precision (dot) and momentum (dash).

Dotdash would later acquire Meredith Corporation in 2021 to become Dotdash Meredith, and then People Inc., now one of the largest digital publishers in the U.S. The foundation for this success was built by Leeds through his strategic acquisitions, restructuring of About.com, and creation of IAC Publishing.

=== Purchase of ASKfm ===
In August 2014, Leeds also spearheaded Ask.com's acquisition of ASKfm, a global social network with 150 million users across 150 countries. ASKfm generates an estimated 20,000 questions per minute with approximately 45 percent of its mobile monthly active users logging in daily. To date, the mobile app has been downloaded more than 40 million times. Leeds has been active champion in spearheading the safety overhaul of ASKfm, proactively driving partnerships with New York and Maryland Attorneys General to design specific safety plans and relocating the company out of Latvia, to Dublin Ireland where he has forged partnerships with local government and children's ministries to ensure the site is up to industry safety standards.

=== Career at Dictionary.com ===
Immediately prior to leading Ask.com, Leeds was the President and chief executive officer of Dictionary.com, a top 50 website in the US. Leeds took over management of Dictionary.com following IAC's acquisition of the company in 2008, which Leeds spearheaded. Under Leeds's direction, Dictionary.com entered the mobile market, launching the Dictionary.com mobile app on all major mobile platforms, resulting in over 40 million app downloads and recognition by Apple, in March 2012, as one of the 25 most downloaded apps of all time. Under Leeds, revenue at Dictionary.com grew 75% and profit rose over 150%.

Leeds also oversaw the successful launch of several Dictionary.com mobile games including Miss Spell's Class and Agent X Word.

=== Other business experience ===
Leeds has worked in various capacities at additional companies including Yahoo! (VP, Product Justice), Overture Services (Senior Director, Trust and Community), OmniSky (Director of Wireless Advertising), BootSpace (CEO), Vodafone (Director, Public Policy), Thelen (Associate Attorney, Antitrust), Carnegie Endowment for International Peace (Fellow), and the Arms Control Association (Researcher). He has served on the board of directors of TRUSTe and the Mobile Marketing Association.

=== Personal biography ===
Born and raised in Los Angeles, California, Leeds is the grandson of Joseph Friedman, inventor of the flexible straw. He attended high school at Crossroads School before receiving his bachelor's degree cum laude from University of California, Berkeley in 1992. He graduated with high honors in Political Economy and served as the department's valedictorian. He earned his Juris Doctor cum laude in 1996 from the Georgetown University Law Center where he was an editor of The Georgetown Law Journal. In 1994, Leeds married Tracy Porter. They have three daughters. Leeds and his family live in Danville, California.
