= Robert C. Craig =

Robert Charles Craig (March 9, 1921 – March 25, 1990) was a professor in the department of Counseling, Educational Psychology, and Special Education at Michigan State University from 1966 to 1989.

Craig also worked at Washington State University, American Institute of Research, Marquee University, and the University of Pittsburgh.

Craig published three books: The Psychology of Learning in the Classroom, Contemporary Educational Psychology, and Contemporary Issues in Educational Psychology.
