= Laurel Kuxhaus =

American biomechanical engineer

Laurel Kuxhaus is an American biomechanical engineer whose research focuses on the mechanics of soft and hard tissues in joints such as the elbow and ankle, and the effects of injuries on those joints, in many cases using cervine specimens as a novel ex-vivo model. A substantial contribution of her technical work demonstrated that vertebral fractures can occur under low-load, low-angle, high-repetition loading.

She recently served as a Program Officer in the Office of Strategic Coordination – The Common Fund at the National Institutes of Health. Outside of her engineering work, she is an avid oboist.

== Education and career ==
Kuxhaus earned dual degrees in engineering mechanics and music as an undergraduate at Michigan State University, where she graduated in 2001. After a 2003 master's degree in mechanical engineering from Cornell University, she completed a Ph.D. in bioengineering in 2008 at the University of Pittsburgh. Her doctoral dissertation, Development of a feedback-controlled elbow simulator: design validation and clinical application, was jointly advised by Jeffrey S. Vipperman and Mark Carl Miller.

She was a professor of mechanical and aerospace engineering in the Wallace H. Coulter School of Engineering at Clarkson University from 2009-2024. There, she directed the Orthopaedic Biomechanics Laboratory from 2009-2024. During that time (2017-2024), she was a founder and Chief Technology Officer of Adaptable Ortho Innovations, an entrepreneurial small business that patented and designed an adjustable-length intramedullary nail, which is now FDA-cleared. She was promoted to full professor in 2023.

Her influence on biomedical engineering pedagogy is recognized through external funding to promote training in interdisciplinary design projects in assistive technology . Her work disseminating best practices in classroom Journal Clubs have been translated into practice by others. She also secured funding for, and initiated, the BOREALIS Scholars program at Clarkson University, an intensive program to introduce first- and second-year undergraduate students to hands-on biomedical research projects. She led the Education Committee of the Bioengineering Division of ASME from 2013-2016.

While on sabbatical (2018-2019) from Clarkson to serve as an ASME Congressional Fellow in Bioengineering in the office of congressman Dan Lipinski, where her work contributed to the Growing Artificial Intelligence Through Research Act as well as The Medical Device Sterilization Challenge Act of 2019. She then served as a program director at the National Science Foundation from 2019 to 2023, In addition to leading the Biomechanics and Mechanobiology (BMMB) program, she substantially contributed to the development of the BRITE and ERI solicitations. She then continued her career in the federal government, joining the National Institutes of Health in the summer of 2024.

== Recognition ==
Kuxhaus was named as an ASME Fellow by the American Society of Mechanical Engineers in 2017. In 2024 she became a Fellow of the American Institute for Medical and Biological Engineering, "for advancements in musculoskeletal biomechanics, medical device design, technology transfer, education and pedagogy, public policy, and work within government". Her leadership and teamwork have been recognized by a 2022 NSF Director's Award for Superior Accomplishment (Group) for her work with the Engineering Research Initiation solicitation, and in 2024 by a Phalanx Award to the Re-Imagining Clarkson Task Force.
