= Ryan M. Eustice =

American roboticist

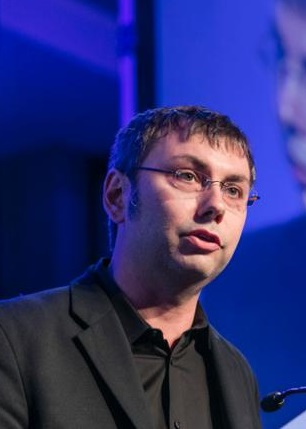
- Occupations: Roboticist, academic, executive and researcher
- Known for: Simultaneous localization and mapping marine robotics automated driving
- Awards: National Science Foundation CAREER Award (2008); Office of Naval Research Young Investigator Award (2007)

Academic background
- Education: Michigan State University; Massachusetts Institute of Technology

Academic work
- Discipline: Robotics
- Institutions: Toyota Research Institute (TRI); University of Michigan

Ryan M. Eustice (born 1976) is an American roboticist, and the Senior Vice President of Human-centric AI and Technology Adoption at the Toyota Research Institute (TRI). He is also a professor of Robotics and Naval Architecture & Marine Engineering at the University of Michigan.

Eustice received his bachelor's degree in Mechanical Engineering from Michigan State University in 1998 and his Doctoral Degree in Ocean Engineering from Massachusetts Institute of Technology/Woods Hole Oceanographic Institution Joint Program in Ocean Engineering in 2005, and then served as Postdoctoral Research Scholar at Johns Hopkins University for a year.

Eustice is best known for his work in advancing large-scale simultaneous localization and mapping, including visual mapping of the RMS Titanic. He established the Perceptual Robotics Laboratory (PeRL) in the Naval Architecture & Marine Engineering Department at the University of Michigan. He was a founding and core faculty member in the creation and launch of the UM Robotics Institute and its associated PhD and MS programs in Robotics.

Eustice has published over 160 technical papers in the field of robotics with over 9300 citations. He won the ONR Young Investigator and NSF CAREER Awards, and best paper of the year award in 2006 in IEEE Transactions on Robotics. He also was a finalist in the 2007 DARPA Urban Challenge with team IVS.

== Bibliography ==
- Kinsey, J. C., Eustice, R. M., & Whitcomb, L. L. (2006, September). A survey of underwater vehicle navigation: Recent advances and new challenges. In IFAC Conference of Manoeuvering and Control of Marine Craft (Vol. 88, pp. 1–12).
- Eustice, R. M., Singh, H., & Leonard, J. J. (2006). Exactly sparse delayed-state filters for view-based SLAM. IEEE Transactions on Robotics, 22(6), 1100–1114.
- Wolcott, R. W., & Eustice, R. M. (2014, September). Visual localization within lidar maps for automated urban driving. In 2014 IEEE/RSJ International Conference on Intelligent Robots and Systems (pp. 176–183). IEEE.
- Carlevaris-Bianco, N., Mohan, A., & Eustice, R. M. (2010, September). Initial results in underwater single image dehazing. In Oceans 2010 Mts/IEEE Seattle (pp. 1–8). IEEE.
- Eustice, R., Singh, H., Leonard, J. J., Walter, M. R., & Ballard, R. (2005, June). Visually Navigating the RMS Titanic with SLAM Information Filters. In Robotics: Science and Systems (Vol. 2005, pp. 57–64).
- Kim, A., & Eustice, R. M. (2013). Real-time visual SLAM for autonomous underwater hull inspection using visual saliency. IEEE Transactions on Robotics, 29(3), 719–733.
- Eustice, R. M., Singh, H., & Whitcomb, L. L. (2011). Synchronous‐clock, one‐way‐travel‐time acoustic navigation for underwater vehicles. journal of field robotics, 28(1), 121–136.
