= Storeboard Media =

Storeboard Media LLC
- Industry: Advertising
- Founded: 2005
- Founder: Doug Leeds; Jeff McElnea
- Headquarters: New York City
- Area served: United States of America
- Key people: Doug Leeds; (CEO); Rick Sirvaitis; (President)
- Website: www.storeboards.net

Storeboard Media LLC is a media sales company that places indoor billboards, called "StoreBoards", on the security pedestals at the entrances and exits of more than 13,725 chain drug stores across the United States, including CVS Pharmacy, Duane Reade, Kerr Drug, USA Drug, Rite Aid and K-Mart.

As of 2008, StoreBoards were in 50 states with markets including the top 50 designated marketing areas in the country and generated an estimated 1.2 billion monthly impressions. StoreBoards’ advertisers to date include P&G, Unilever, Hershey, Energizer, Vonage, Kraft, Adams, L'Oréal, Maybelline, Pfizer, RediClinic, Wyeth, CBS Television and CW11.

Storeboard Media LLC sells, produces, installs, and verifies StoreBoards on behalf of the retailer, as a new branding medium at the point-of-sale. StoreBoards are sold in four-week cycles to a single advertiser per store who provides their own creative content in advance. They typically feature a product or logo for branding purposes and have also been utilized extensively in New York City for the marketing of Broadway shows.
