= Kirsten Frank Kelly =

American judge

Kirsten Frank Kelly is a judge of the 1st District of the Michigan Court of Appeals. She has a bachelor's degree from Michigan State University and a Juris Doctor degree from the University of Detroit Mercy.

She was elected to the Grosse Pointe Municipal Court in 1987. She was elected to the state court of appeals in 2000.

== Sources ==
- Michigan court of appeals bio of Kelly
