= Raquel Gur =

American psychiatrist

Raquel E. Gur
- Born: 1949 (age 76–77); Israel
- Education: Hebrew University of Jerusalem; Michigan State University; University of Pennsylvania
- Known for: Research on schizophrenia
- Awards: William C. Menninger Memorial Award from the American College of Physicians (2011)
- Scientific career
- Workplaces: Perelman School of Medicine of the University of Pennsylvania
- Thesis: Experimental validation and personality correlates of conjugate lateral eye movements as an index of contralateral hemispheric activation (1973)

Raquel E. Gur is an American psychiatrist of Israeli origin, known for her research on schizophrenia. She is Professor of Psychiatry, Neurology, and Radiology at the University of Pennsylvania Perelman School of Medicine. She has been a faculty member of the University of Pennsylvania's Department of Psychiatry since 1975, and serves as Karl and Linda Rickels Professor of Psychiatry and Vice Chair of Research Development within this department. She has served as president of both the Society of Biological Psychiatry and the American College of Neuropsychopharmacology. She was elected as a fellow of the American College of Neuropsychopharmacology in 2000 and to the National Academy of Medicine in 2001. In 2011, she received the William C. Menninger Memorial Award from the American College of Physicians.
