= Accelerator physicist =

Specialist in particle accelerators

An accelerator physicist is a scientist who contributes to the field of accelerator physics, involving the fundamental physical mechanisms underlying beams of charged particles accelerated to high energies and the structures and materials needed to do so. In addition to developing and applying such basic theoretical models, an accelerator physicist contributes to the design, operation and optimization of particle accelerators.

== Significant accelerator physicists ==
- John Cockcroft
- Ernest Courant
- Helen T. Edwards
- Donald William Kerst
- Ernest Lawrence
- Carlo Rubbia
- Ernest Rutherford
- Andrew Sessler
- Robert Van de Graaff
- Simon van der Meer
- Ernest Walton
- Rolf Widerøe

== See also ==
- Accelerator physics
- List of particle accelerators
