= History of Michigan State University =

Name changes
Date	Name change
February 12, 1855	Agricultural College of the State of Michigan
March 15, 1861	State Agricultural College
June 2, 1909	Michigan Agricultural College
May 13, 1925	Michigan State College of Agriculture and Applied Science
July 1, 1955	Michigan State University of Agriculture and Applied Science
January 1, 1964	Michigan State University

The history of Michigan State University dates back to 1855, when the Michigan Legislature established the Agricultural College of the State of Michigan under the encouragement of the Michigan State Agricultural Society and the Michigan Farmer, the state's leading agricultural periodical. As the first agricultural college in the United States, the school served as a model for other institutions of its kind established in the period, to give an instance, the Agricultural College of Pennsylvania.

Together with the Agricultural College of Pennsylvania (now Pennsylvania State University), the College became one of the first two land-grant institutions under the Morrill Act enacted during Abraham Lincoln's presidency. This earned the school the title of "The Nation’s Pioneer Land Grant College". The first class graduated in 1861 right after the onset of the American Civil War. That same year, the Michigan Legislature approved a plan to allow the College to adopt a four-year curriculum and grant master's degrees. In 1870, the College became co-educational and expanded its curriculum beyond agriculture into a broad array of coursework commencing with home economics for women students. The school admitted its first African American student in 1899. In 1885, the College had begun offering degrees in engineering and other applied sciences to students.

After World War II, its president John A. Hannah began the largest expansion in the university's history, aided by the G.I. Bill, and the university has grown to become one of the largest universities by enrollment in the United States with over 50,000 students as of 2014 since then. In its centennial year of 1955, the state officially made the college a university, and the current name, Michigan State University, was adopted in 1964.

== Agricultural Roots ==
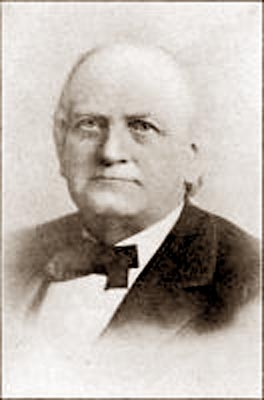
John Clough Holmes, co-founder of the Michigan State Agricultural Society and the founder of the Agricultural College of the State of Michigan (now Michigan State University)

The rise of scientific agriculture in Europe in the first half of the nineteenth century and the desire for formal agricultural education at the college level by forward looking agriculturalists in Michigan gave impetus to a movement that led to the establishment of the Agricultural College of the State of Michigan in 1855. The Michigan Farmer, a leading agricultural periodical, and the Michigan State Agricultural Society led public discussions relative to the virtues and benefits of an agricultural college for the state’s farmers and economy.

The Michigan State Agricultural Society, founded in 1849 to promote the organized advancement of farming statewide, almost immediately determined the State should establish and support an agricultural college. To that end, the Society tasked its trustee, Bela Hubbard, a natural scientist and farm owner in Detroit, to draft a memorial for presentation to the Michigan State Legislature requesting the establishment of such a college, which he did in 1850. In the document, Hubbard, a Hamilton College graduate, noted the Society’s belief that a liberal education promoting a thorough knowledge of the “fundamental laws of science” was essential to intelligent farming. He therefore rejected the notion of creating a mere trade school for farmers, with his memorial noting: “Nor should the claims of literature and fine arts be wholly neglected as they tend to polish the mind and manners, refine the taste, and add greater luster to life.” Thus, Hubbard tasked the future college to offer what he termed an “enlightened liberal education.”

Following the Society's request, the state constitutional convention of 1850 adopted Article 13, Section 11 which states in part: “The Legislature shall encourage the promotion of intellectual, scientific and agricultural improvement, and as soon as practicable, provide for the establishment of an Agricultural School.” The constitution, however, specified that this school could be either an autonomous institution or be a branch of the University of Michigan. This provision set off a bitter controversy between supporters of the existing university and proponents of a new, independent institution.

John Clough Holmes, secretary of the agricultural society, worked tirelessly to convince the legislature to establish an agricultural college. Holmes was born in Massachusetts and moved to Michigan in 1835. He served as president of the Detroit Horticultural Society in 1847, and then in 1849, he co-founded the Michigan State Agricultural Society. Henry Philip Tappan, president of the university, forcefully made the case for creating a department of agriculture in the university. Holmes and advocates for the separate institution feared that agricultural studies would not receive the attention needed to survive and thrive in the university, which put great emphasis on the study of medicine and law and a literary curriculum rooted in classical languages. In addition, Tappan made no provision for the “model farm”—deemed essential by farmers.

To no one man is the College so much indebted as John Clough Holmes.

— Theophilus C. Abbot, 3rd President of the State Agricultural College

In early 1855, Holmes convinced the legislature to pass an act establishing “a State Agricultural School” to be located on a site selected by the Michigan State Agricultural Society within ten miles of Lansing. On February 12, 1855, Michigan Governor Kinsley S. Bingham signed a bill establishing the nation's first agriculture college, the Agricultural College of the State of Michigan. The State Board of Education was designated as the institution’s governing body. The board also oversaw the Michigan State Normal School in Ypsilanti, which had opened in 1852.

Classes began in May 1857 with three buildings, five faculty members, 63 male students, and a college president. The College's first president Joseph R. Williams, a Harvard graduate, was a passionate promoter for interdisciplinary education. Under Williams, following input from the faculty, the College established a curriculum offering two-thirds science and one-third liberal arts coursework.

It is noteworthy that the agricultural college’s enabling legislation mandated a curriculum that went far beyond practical agriculture: “The course of instruction in said college shall include the following branches of education, viz: an English and scientific course, natural philosophy, chemistry, botany, animal and vegetable anatomy and physiology, geology, mineralogy, meteorology, entomology, veterinary art, mensuration, leveling and political economy, with bookkeeping and the mechanic arts which are directly connected with agriculture, …” From its inception, the Agricultural College of the State of Michigan offered courses of study that would characterize the land-grant philosophy of higher education after the passage of the Morrill Act in 1862. Michigan’s agricultural college educated people to be well-informed citizens, as well as good farmers. The school offered a three-part curriculum that balanced liberal arts, science and practical vocational studies. Williams also excluded Latin and Greek studies from the early curriculum. The College did require three hours of daily manual labor, which helped students defray expenses and develop the campus infrastructure while students learned scientific principles through their efforts.

However, after just two years, Williams ran into conflict with the managing State Board of Education. Despite Williams' eloquent defense of an all-round education for the masses, the board saw the College as inefficient and had far deviated from the agriculture focus as the founder, John Clough Holmes, had anticipated. Indeed, some agriculturalists began protesting against the College's unpractical curriculum with some even calling for the College's abolition. In 1859, Williams resigned. The Board then reduced the curriculum to a two-year, vocation-oriented farming program, a move that resulted almost overnight in a drastic reduction in enrollment. The school was soon in dire financial straits and threatened with dissolution. After resigning from the College, Williams was elected to Michigan's legislature, and thereafter, elevated to president pro tem of the Michigan Senate. He helped pass the Reorganization Act of 1861. Following Bela Hubbard’s foundational memorial conceptualizing an "enlightened liberal education," the Reorganization Act mandated the College offer courses in English language and literature, mathematics, moral philosophy, history, civil engineering, technology, and household economy. The new law also mandated that the College have a four-year curriculum and the power to grant master's degrees. Under the act, a newly created body known as the State Board of Agriculture took over from the State Board of Education in running the institution. At that time, the legislature adopted the name of State Agricultural College.

The school's first class graduated in 1861.

== Financial Struggles and the Morrill Land-Grant Colleges Act ==
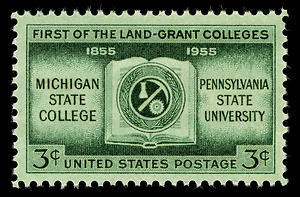
Together with the Pennsylvania State University, Michigan State University claims to be the first land-grant college in the United States. (USPS commemorative stamp)

In 1862, President Abraham Lincoln signed the Morrill Land-Grant Colleges Act to support similar colleges nationally, the first instance of federal funding for education. The federal funding had rescued the Agricultural College from extinction.

In 1862 the newly created State Board of Agriculture appointed English Literature professor Theophilus Capen ("T.C.") Abbot president, much to the professor's surprise. Abbot remained president for twenty-two years and helped stabilize the College during and after the Civil War. During his presidency, the University of Michigan brought a proposal before the legislature to merge with the Agricultural College. Andrew Dickson White, who was president of newly opened Cornell University, argued, "The State of Michigan... indeed gave its Agricultural College an excellent faculty and they have achieved much success considering their means but infinitely better would it have been to combine that Agricultural College with their noble University." Nevertheless, the Legislature voted down the proposal in 1863, but it returned to the floor in 1865, 1867, and again in 1869.

Abbot worked hard to perpetuate Williams' vision of a "whole man" educational approach. He took the College back to its original mixed liberal/practical curriculum taught by learned scholars. By the 1880s these included botany professor William J. Beal, an early experimental botanist, pre-geneticist, who invented a hardier strain of hybrid corn through cross-fertilization. Beal corresponded with Charles Darwin and championed the laboratory, or "inductive", teaching method. He conducted his classes in the first botanical laboratory building on an American campus. Another distinguished faculty member was the alumnus-turned-professor, Liberty Hyde Bailey. Often called the "Father of American Horticulture", Bailey was the first person to raise the study of horticulture to a science equal to botany. Other noteworthy 19th Century faculty included Walter B. Barrows, a nationally-respected ornithologist whose treatise Michigan Bird Life is widely considered the most comprehensive study of the subject, while Rolla C. Carpenter (B.S. 1873) was a building construction specialist as well as a pioneering HVAC engineer.

Although the school's then-isolated location limited student housing and enrollment during the 19th century, the College became reputable largely due to alumni who went on to distinguished careers, many of whom led or taught in other land grant colleges. While the institution emphasized scientific agriculture, its graduates went into a wide variety of professions.

Our graduates show that a love of knowledge has been infused into them by frequently returning to study or by resorting to other institutions of learning to continue their studies. They have gone from us to the University [of Michigan], to Cornell, Yale, Harvard, England, France and Germany to continue their studies.

— Theophilus C. Abbot, 3rd President of the State Agricultural College, wrote in the 1878 report of the State Board of Agriculture

Notable 19th-century graduates include the aforementioned Bailey; Charles E. St. John, a prominent early 20th century astrophysicist who was an associate of Albert Einstein; Ray Stannard Baker, a famed turn of the 20th century "muckraker" journalist and Pulitzer Prize winning biographer of Woodrow Wilson; and William Chandler Bagley, a pioneering education reformer. In the 1870s, foreign students began traveling to the United States to attend the Michigan State Agricultural College such that, by the 1880s, they were a significant presence on campus. In 1887, two percent (six out of 312) of the College's student population were Japanese. Among the 1880s students were Michitaro Tsuda, (B.S.1884), who went on to become a member of the Japanese emperor's Privy Council, and Minakata Kumagusu, (1888), a prominent Japanese environmental scientist.

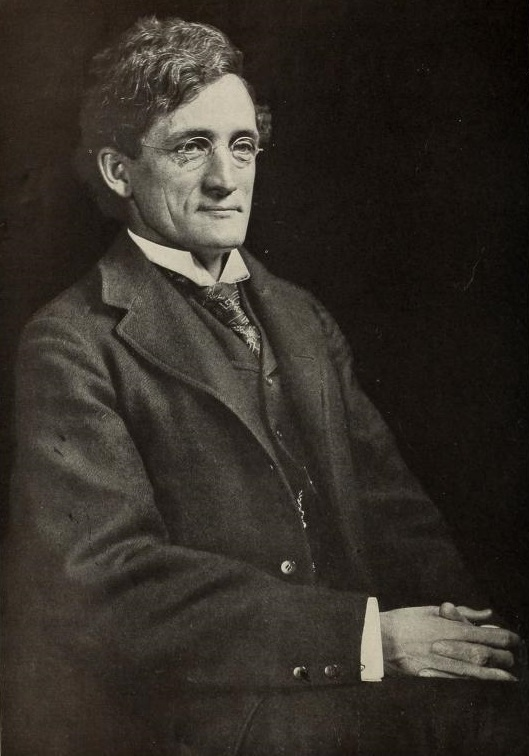
Liberty Hyde Bailey, often called the "Father of American Horticulture," graduated from the Agricultural College in 1882

While the College had many successful alumni, many of Michigan farmers still feared that a college education would dissuade their children from agriculture. President Abbot helped win them over by taking the College to the farm. In 1876 the Agricultural College held the first "Farmers' Institutes" in rural communities across the state, where school professors shared experimental and practical information with Michigan farmers. This concept led to the Hatch Act of 1887, which provided federal funding for agricultural experiment stations operated by each state's Land Grant college. Through these "Farmers' Institutes", T.C. Abbot converted many skeptical farmers into ardent College supporters.

== Pioneer in Coeducation ==
The College first admitted women in 1870 but the school's relative isolation and lack of women's living quarters tamped coeducational enrollment for decades. The few women who enrolled either boarded with faculty families or were locals who made the daily three-mile trek from Lansing by stagecoach over unpaved Michigan Avenue. The women were educated in the same scientific agriculture courses as men, excepting "practical agriculture." Since the late 1880s, local Granger leader Mary Ann Bryant Mayo advocated for a curriculum tailored to the skills women would need as future farm and household managers. In 1896, the College became one of only fourteen other colleges and universities in America to adopt and meld a home economics curriculum within the liberal arts and sciences program, increasing female enrollment. That same year, the school relocated male students from the old Abbot Hall dormitory to allow for greater a number of women to enroll in the course.

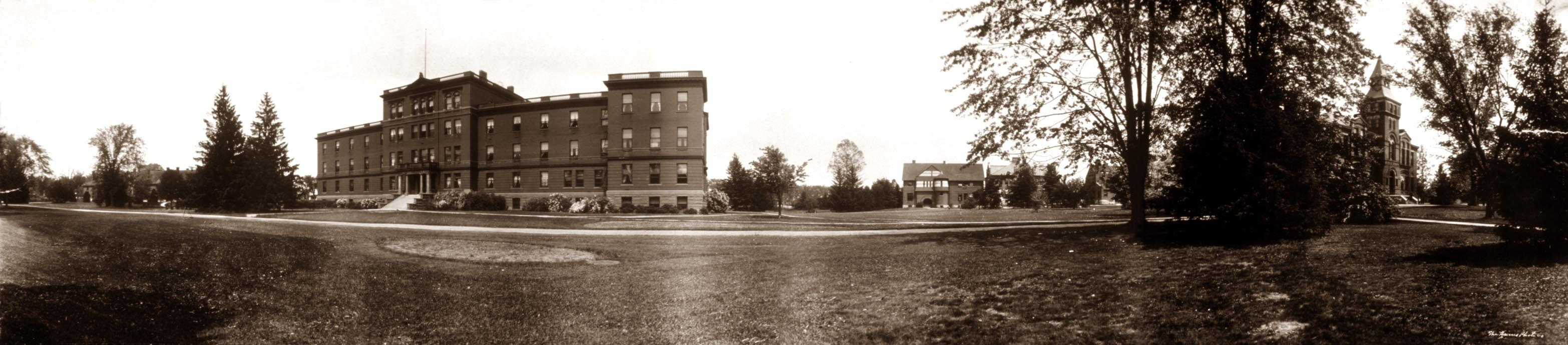
Morrill Hall in 1912, known at the time as the "Women's Building". To the right are Horticulture, Bacteriology, Botany, and Administration (Library–Museum).

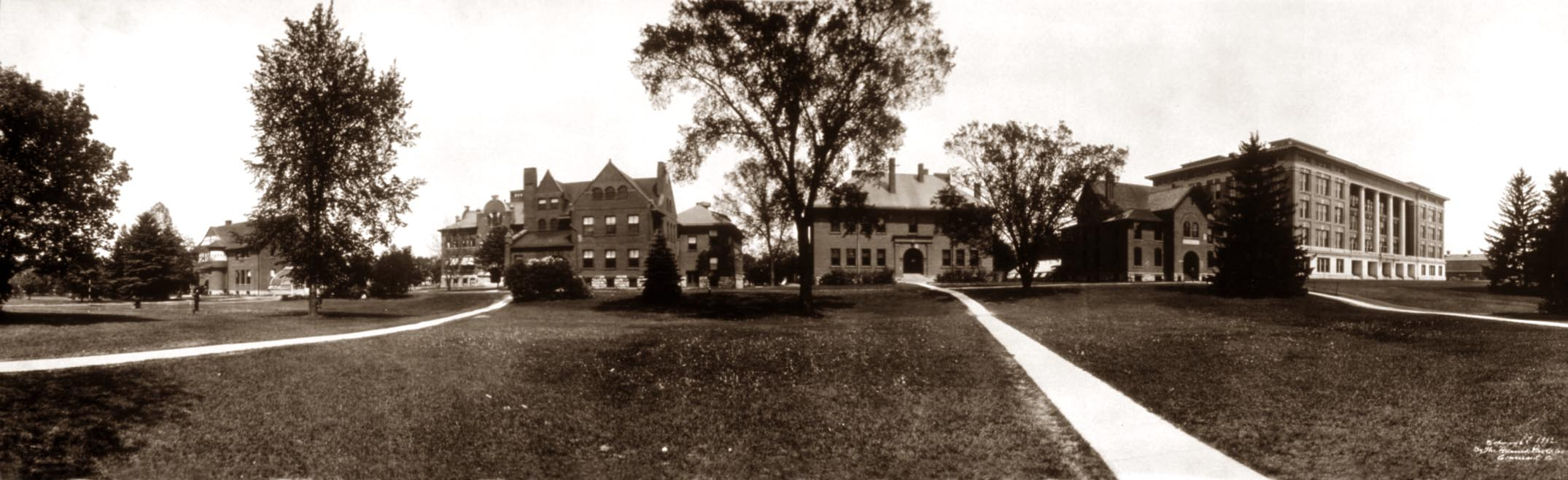
Michigan Agricultural College's Laboratory Row in 1912: Horticulture, Bacteriology, Botany, Dairy, Entomology, and Agriculture.

Considering the Morrill Act's original mandate that Land Grant Colleges teach engineering (then called "mechanic arts"), the State Agricultural College had developed civil and electrical engineering programs to complement the original mechanical program of 1885. These separate disciplines were unified in a new Department of Engineering in 1908. In 1885, in order to fill out its mandate as a Morrill Act college, the College established a Mechanics program which became the College's first full-fledged, degree-granting engineering program. When a 1916 fire destroyed the College's nine-year-old engineering hall, Lansing automobile magnate Ransom E. Olds presented with a gift of $100,000 in 1917 for a new engineering building to be erected directly upon the foundations of the burned hall. The donation resulted in Olds Hall. The original building is still standing but now houses the University Relations division as well as classroom space.

In 1899, the State Agricultural College finally admitted its first African American student, William O. Thompson. After graduation, Thompson taught at what is now Tuskegee University, founded and headed by Booker T. Washington. Washington later delivered one of his most memorable addresses to the class of 1900 at commencement: in the 1900 commencement address, Booker T. Washington said "Without industrial development there can be no wealth; without wealth there can be no leisure; without leisure, no opportunity for thoughtful reflection and the cultivation of the higher arts." MSU President Jonathan L. Snyder had invited Washington to be the College's Class of 1900 commencement speaker. A few years later, Myrtle Craig became the first African-American woman to enroll at the College. Graduating with the Class of 1907, she received her degree from U.S. President Theodore Roosevelt, commencement speaker for the Semi-Centennial celebration of the College's opening. In addition to President Roosevelt, the Semi-Centennial brought to campus college and university presidents and representatives from across the country, including several from future Ivy League schools. Two years later, the college officially changed its name to Michigan Agricultural College, since by this time there were many other agricultural colleges across the country.

== Smith–Lever Act ==
In 1914, the United States Congress passed the Smith–Lever Act, which provided federal funding for a system of state cooperative extension service. Like T.C. Abbot's initial "Farmers' Institutes", these extension services spread college-based knowledge about agriculture and related issues to citizens around the state. Such extension services served as the third prong of the Land Grant college mission of education, research and public service. With this new mandate, the College moved to expand its curriculum beyond agriculture and engineering, including expanding liberal arts coursework, which has been central to the university's mission since its founding, into a separate degree-granting division (and later, college) which was established in 1924. The college officially changed its name to Michigan State College of Agriculture and Applied Science in 1925.

== Servicemen's Readjustment Act of 1944 and Expansion ==
Enrollment
School year	Number of students
1857–1858	123
1907–1908	1,191
1954–1955	21,295

In 1941, Secretary of the State Board of Agriculture John A. Hannah was appointed president. Hannah began the largest expansion in the school's history, aided by the G.I. Bill. Enacted in 1945, the law helped World War II veterans fund post-secondary educations. During this time the bulk of the South Campus was quickly built to allow for an ever-growing influx of students. One of Hannah's strategies was to build a new residence hall, enroll enough students to fill it and then use the income to start construction on a new dormitory. In the process the president built the nation's largest university housing system. Under Hannah's plan, enrollment increased from 15,000 in 1950 to 38,000 in 1965.

On the school's centennial year of 1955, the State of Michigan officially designated the school as a university even though Hannah and others felt it had been one, in fact, for decades. The college thus became Michigan State University of Agriculture and Applied Science. After the ratification of the Michigan Constitution of 1964, the university's governing body changed its name from the State Board of Agriculture to the Michigan State University Board of Trustees. At that time, the school's name was officially shortened to simply Michigan State University, though since the 1920s longstanding convention omitted the "Agriculture and Applied Science" part of the name.

== Michigan State University (1964-present) ==
Michigan State presidents
President	Start year	End year
Joseph R. Williams	1857	1859
Lewis R. Fiske	1859	1862
Theophilus C. Abbot	1862	1885
Edwin Willits	1885	1889
Oscar Clute	1889	1893
Lewis G. Gorton	1893	1895
Jonathan L. Snyder	1896	1915
Frank S. Kedzie	1915	1921
David Friday	1922	1923
Kenyon L. Butterfield	1924	1928
Robert S. Shaw	1928	1941
John A. Hannah	1941	1969
Walter Adams	1969	1970
Clifton R. Wharton, Jr.	1970	1978
Edgar L. Harden	1978	1979
M. Cecil Mackey	1979	1985
John A. DiBiaggio	1985	1992
Gordon Guyer	1992	1993
M. Peter McPherson	1993	2004
Lou Anna K. Simon	2005	2018
Samuel L. Stanley	2019	2022
Kevin Guskiewicz	2024	

In the 1960s, Nigerian President Nnamdi Azikiwe invited the university to partner with Nigerians to build the first land-grant model university in Africa, the University of Nigeria. The many years of faculty experience in Nigeria created the foundation for a major MSU African Studies Center. By the 1990s MSU had the largest faculty in the nation of Africa specialists (170) and was producing more Ph.D.s on Africa, offering more study abroad in Africa (26), and teaching more African languages (30) than any other university. The faculty is deeply engaged in many African development problems in food security, health (especially tropical diseases such as malaria, river blindness, and filariasis), education, and gender equity. In 1978, the University divested the stocks of companies doing business in apartheid-governed South Africa from its endowment portfolio.

By 1969, the student body had become politically active over issues such as the Civil Rights Movement. Protests led to the resignation of President John A. Hannah and the blocking of the construction of Interstate 496 through the campus. In 1970, the Board of Trustees appointed President Clifton Wharton, the university's first African-American president and the first minority president of a major public American university. Under Wharton, the university created co-ed residence halls and residential colleges. In 1988, the university won its third Rose Bowl, this time beating Trojans 20–17.

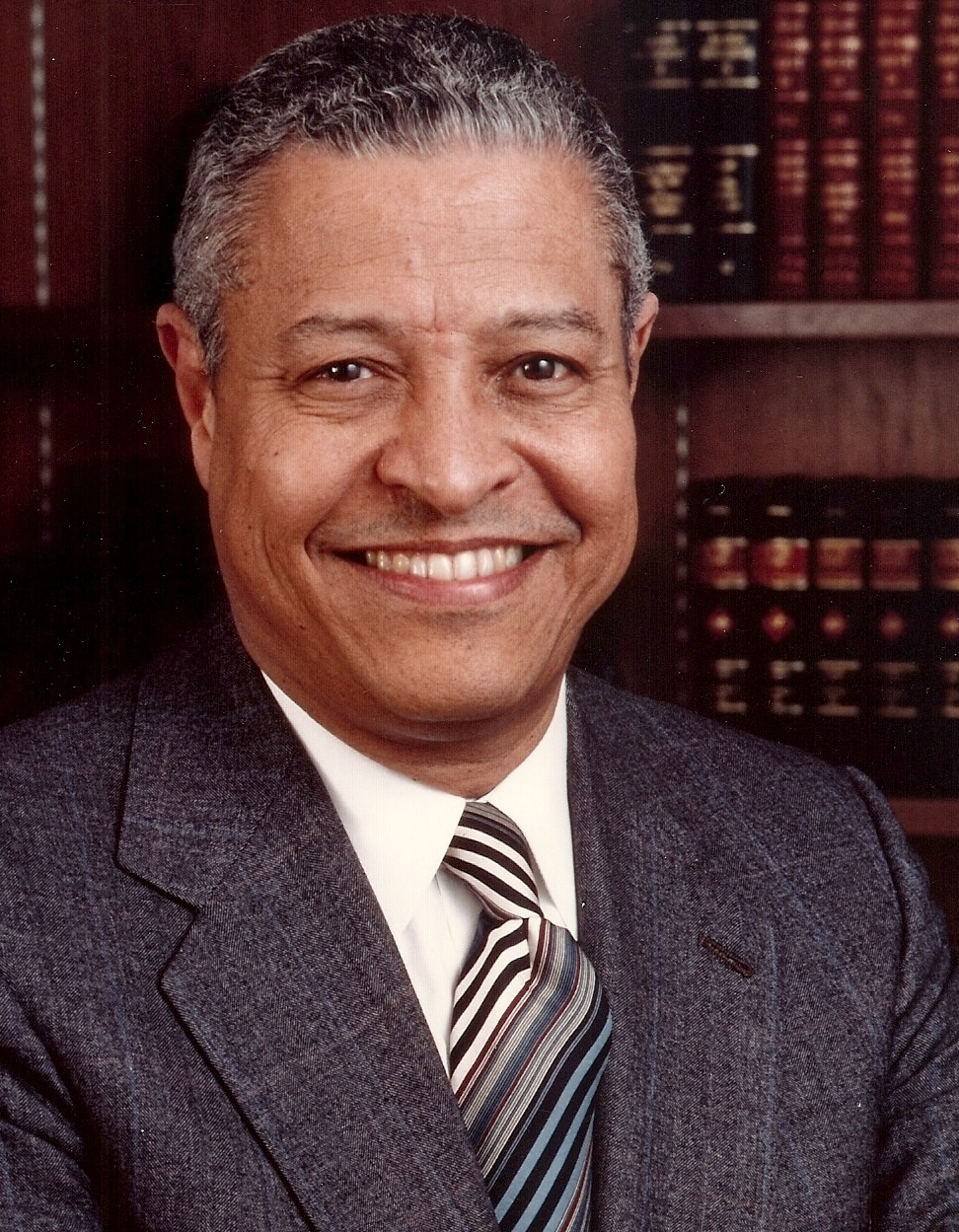
President Clifton R. Wharton, Jr.

As the pioneer land grant university, it has historically sought to provide educational opportunities to a wide variety of students, especially to those from the farming and working classes. Former President Peter McPherson stated "access to MSU and the education it offers is one of our roots" while noting the challenge, even irony, in maintaining such openness as the university's quality makes it ever more popular and difficult to be admitted into.

In more recent years, "town and gown" relations have soured as students and permanent residents looked at each other with increasing hostility. This erupted in clashes involving the police in 1997, 1998, and 1999. Local and national news referred to the disturbances as riots. After several years without any major incidents, another disturbance broke out on April 2, 2005, after Tar Heels defeated Spartans in the 2005 NCAA Final Four. Officially called a "civil disturbance," the ensuing violence sparked accusations of police brutality in East Lansing.

In a 1999 incident unrelated to the riots, eco-anarchist activists including Rod Coronado burned down the Agriculture Hall.

East Lansing's plan to redevelop Cedar Village (a student-dominated neighborhood at the center of several riots) has increased the tensions between the school and local government. In 2005, East Lansing City Council declared the neighborhood "blighted", and proposed to redevelop the 35 acres (14 ha) site as a complex of upscale condominiums and retail stores called East Village. Several fraternities in the affected area mounted a campaign against the redevelopment plan.

In 2004, President Lou Anna Simon called for the university to become the "global leader" of Land Grant institutions by the year 2012. These plans include creating a new residential college (the Residential College in Arts & Humanities), investing in biotechnology research, and increasing National Institutes of Health donations above the $100 million mark. As part of these plans the university sought and was awarded the Facility for Rare Isotope Beams by the Department of Energy in 2008. The $550 million facility will study the properties of rare isotopes and better allow scientists to study origins of elements.

=== 2023 mass shooting ===
On the evening of February 13, 2023, a mass shooting occurred on campus that resulted in three students being killed, among them Arielle Anderson, Brian Fraser, and Alexandria Verner, and five injured. The gunman, 43-year-old Anthony Dwayne McRae, took his own life via a self-inflicted gunshot wound after a confrontation with the police.

== Bibliography ==
- Darling, Birt. (1950). City in the Forest; The Story of Lansing. New York: Stratford House. LCCN 50008202.
- Davis, Anderson (2005). Michigan State University: Off the Record. New York: College Prowler. ISBN 1-59658-083-6.
- Heineman, Kenneth J. (1993). Campus Wars: The Peace Movement at American State Universities in the Vietnam Era. New York: New York University Press. ISBN 0-8147-3512-6.
- Hugo, Nancy (1997). Earth Works: Readings for Backyard Gardeners. University of Virginia Press. ISBN 0-8139-1831-6.
- Kuhn, Madison. (1955). Michigan State: The First Hundred Years, 1855–1955. East Lansing: Michigan State University Press. ASIN B0007E4VX6.
- Momin, Shenila (2002). The History of Woman's Course at Michigan Agricultural College, 1896–1905, PDF Retrieved March 21, 2006.
- Nixon, Mark (2004). Journal of Our Times: 150 Years in the Life of Greater Lansing. Lansing, Michigan: Lansing State Journal. ISBN 1-932129-85-5.
- Miller, Whitney. (2002). East Lansing: Collegeville Revisited (Images of America). Charleston, South Carolina: Arcadia Publishing. ISBN 0-7385-2045-4.
- Rodriguez, Michael (2004). R.E. Olds and Industrial Lansing. Charleston, South Carolina: Arcadia Publishing. ISBN 0-7385-3272-X.
- Widder, Keith (2005). Michigan Agricultural College: The Evolution of a Land-Grant Philosophy, 1855–1925. East Lansing: Michigan State University Press. ISBN 0-87013-734-4.
