= List of presidents of Michigan State University =

President of Michigan State University
- Incumbent; Kevin Guskiewicz since 2024
- Appointer: Michigan State University Board of Trustees
- Formation: 1857
- First holder: Joseph R. Williams
- Website: Office of the President

The following persons had led Michigan State University or one of its predecessors since 1857:

== Presidents ==
Michigan State University
No.	Image	President	Start date	End date	Ref.
Presidents of the Agricultural College of the State of Michigan (1855–1861)
1		Joseph R. Williams	1857	1859	
2		Lewis R. Fiske	1859	1862	
Presidents of the State Agricultural College (1861–1909)
3		Theophilus C. Abbot	1862	1885	
4		Edwin Willits	1885	1889	
5		Oscar Clute	1889	1893	
6		Lewis G. Gorton	1893	1895	
7		Jonathan L. Snyder	1896	1915	
Presidents of Michigan Agricultural College (1909–1925)
8		Frank S. Kedzie	1915	1921	
9		David Friday	1922	1923	
10		Kenyon L. Butterfield	1924	1928	
Presidents of Michigan State College of Agriculture and Applied Science (1925–1955)
11		Robert S. Shaw	1928	1941	
Presidents of Michigan State University of Agriculture and Applied Science (1955–1964)
12		John A. Hannah	1941	1969	
Presidents of Michigan State University(1964–present)
13		Walter Adams	1969	1970	
14		Clifton R. Wharton, Jr.	1970	1978	
15		Edgar L. Harden	1978	1979	
16		M. Cecil Mackey	1979	1985	
17		John A. DiBiaggio	July 1, 1985	August 31, 1992	
18 interim		Gordon Guyer	September 1, 1992	September 30, 1993	
19		M. Peter McPherson	October 1, 1993	December 31, 2004	
20		Lou Anna K. Simon	January 1, 2005	January 26, 2018	
acting		Bill Beekman	January 26, 2018	February 4, 2018	
interim		John Engler	February 5, 2018	January 17, 2019	
acting		Satish Udpa	January 17, 2019	July 31, 2019	
21		Samuel L. Stanley	August 1, 2019	November 4, 2022	
interim		Teresa Woodruff	November 5, 2022	March 3, 2024	
22		Kevin Guskiewicz	March 4, 2024	TBD	
