= Michigan State University academics =

Academic programs offered at Michigan State University

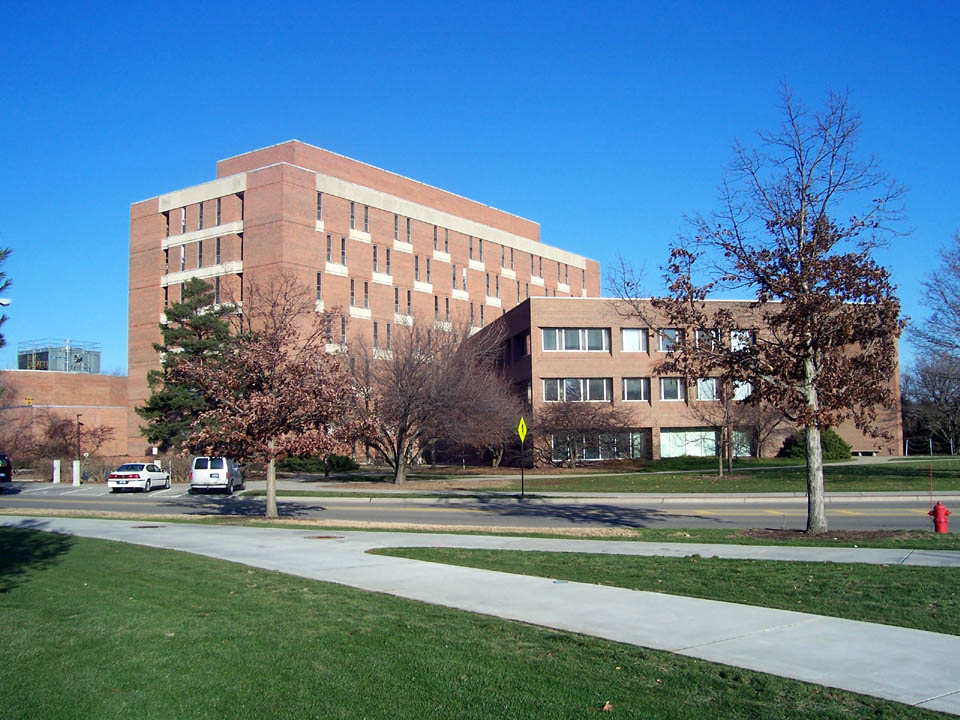
Wells Hall is a sprawling classroom and office building just south of the Red Cedar River.

Michigan State University (MSU) offers over 200 academic programs at its East Lansing, Michigan campus. MSU is well known for its academic programs in education and agriculture, and the university pioneered the studies of packaging, horticulture and music therapy. MSU has one of the premier hospitality schools in the United States, and the study abroad program is one of the largest of any university in the nation, offering more than 300 programs in more than 60 countries on all continents, including Antarctica. MSU's Office of the University Ombudsperson is the oldest continually operating ombudsman office at a college or university in the country. Its most popular undergraduate majors, based on 2021 graduates, were:

Advertising (565)
Biology/Biological Sciences (477)
Psychology (402)
Exercise Science and Kinesiology (388)
Logistics, Materials, and Supply Chain Management (365)
Finance (343)
Mass Communication/Media Studies (300)

As a research university, MSU is one of 66 members of the Association of American Universities. Since its inception as a small agricultural college in 1855, MSU has put a strong emphasis on research. Research performed at MSU has greatly contributed to scientific progress and discoveries related to hybrid corn, homogenized milk, chemotherapy drug cisplatin, and Germanium isotope Ge-60.

== Organization ==
Michigan State University is organized into 17 degree-granting colleges:

- College of Agriculture and Natural Resources
- College of Arts and Letters
- The Eli Broad College of Business and The Eli Broad Graduate School of Management
- College of Communication Arts and Sciences
- College of Education
- College of Engineering
- College of Human Medicine
- James Madison College
- College of Law
- Lyman Briggs College
- College of Music
- College of Natural Science
- College of Nursing
- College of Osteopathic Medicine
- Residential College in the Arts and Humanities
- College of Social Science
- College of Veterinary Medicine

== Demographics ==
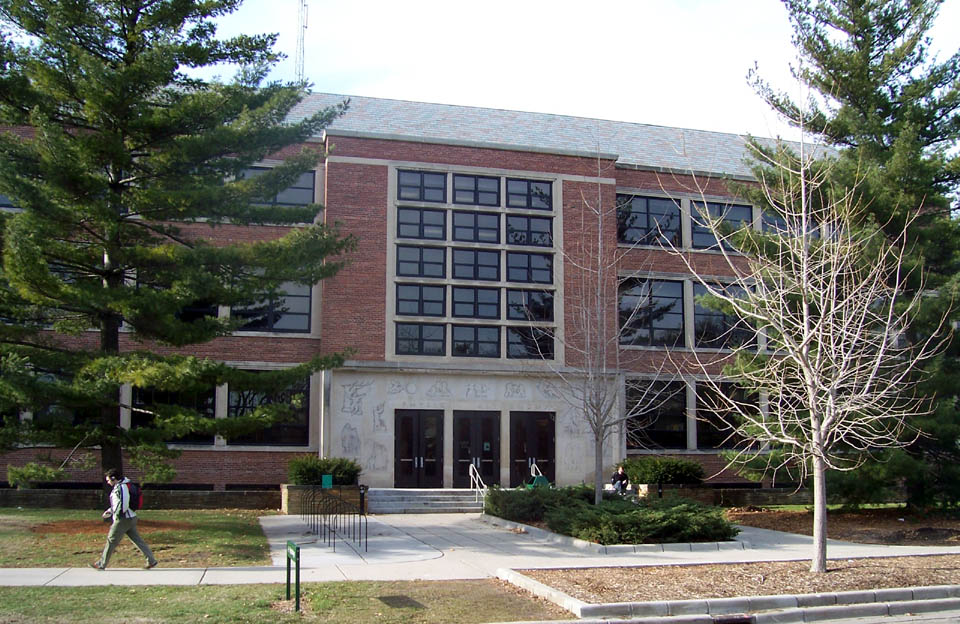
The Art Deco Psychology Building originally housed the Physics and Astronomy department.

As of the 2016-2017 academic year, Michigan State had the ninth largest student body in the United States. As of Fall 2021, there are 49,659 total students, with 38,574 undergraduates and 11,085 graduate and professional students. The undergraduate student body is 51.6% female and 48.4% male. While 73.5% of the entire student body comes from 82 out of 83 counties in the State of Michigan, also represented are all 50 states in the U.S. and about 126 other countries. MSU has about 5,670 faculty and academic staff members, and a student-faculty ratio of 16:1. Like other large American universities, MSU has a large number of teaching assistants teaching upper-level courses. This led The Princeton Review in 2005 to rank MSU eleventh worst in the category of "teaching assistants teach too many upper-level courses".

== Rankings ==
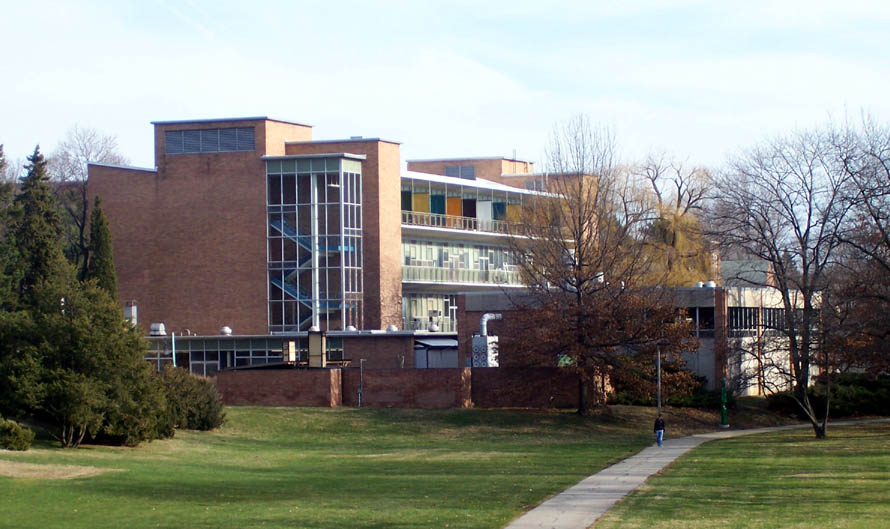
The Kresge Art Center is named for K-Mart founder S.S. Kresge.

MSU ranks 93rd in the world according to Times Higher Education World University Rankings, with U.S. News & World Report ranking MSU 83rd in their Best National University Rankings. The university has over 200 academic programs, several of them highly ranked. U.S. News ranks MSU's graduate-level Elementary Teacher Education, Secondary Teacher Education, Curriculum and Instruction, and Rehabilitation Counseling programs number one in the nation. U.S. News & World Report also ranks MSU's Nuclear Physics program number one in the country. Indeed, MSU's Physics & Astronomy department ranks highly based on the number and impact of faculty publications. In addition to this, U.S. News ranks MSU's undergraduate and graduate Supply Chain Management programs in the Eli Broad College of Business number one in the nation. The National Communication Association ranks MSU doctoral programs as the nation's most effective in educating researchers in health communication and communication technology. MSU also is ranked in the top four in several other communication fields, including international/intercultural communication, mass communication and interpersonal communication. Other programs of note include criminal justice, music therapy, hospitality business, packaging, political science, and communications. MSU's study abroad program is one of the largest of any university in the United States, with 2,832 MSU students studying abroad in 2018–19 in over 60 countries on all continents, including Antarctica.

== Research ==
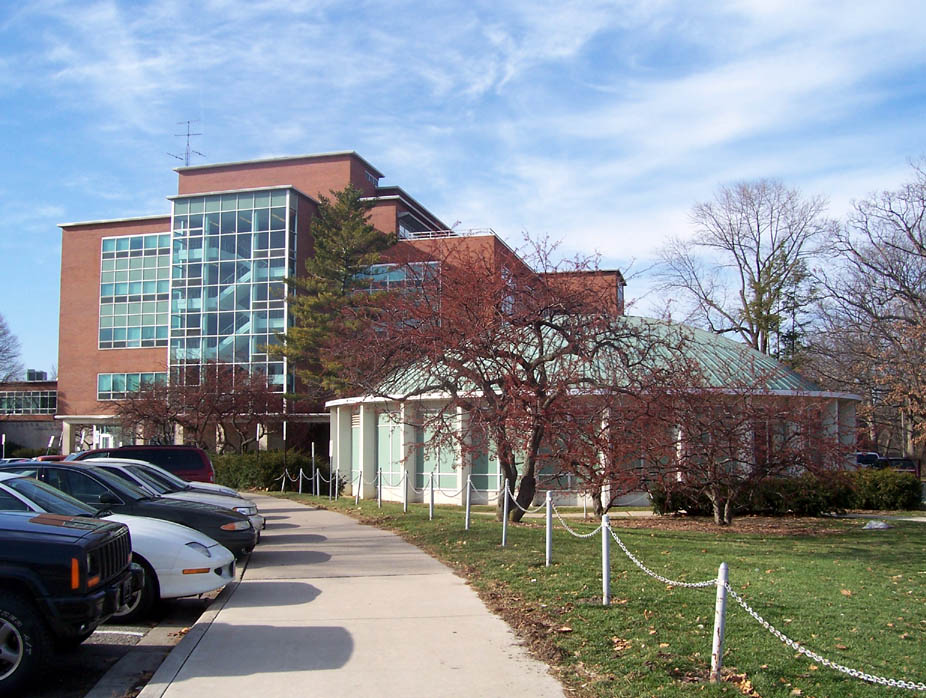
Erickson Hall houses the MSU College of Education.

For fiscal year 2019-2020, MSU's total research expenditures were $713.2 million, and Federally funded research expenditures were $329.7 million, capping a long history of productive research. In the late 19th century, botany professor William J. Beal's research consisted of using cross-fertilization leading to hybrid corn, becoming one of the pioneers in the development of hybrid corn and doubling the yield of corn plantings at the time. In the early 20th century, MSU dairy professor and industry pioneer G. Malcolm Trout made significant progress in milk production methods, though he did not invent the processes of pasteurization nor homogenization. In the 1960s, Chemistry professor Barnett Rosenberg and colleagues Loretta VanCamp and Thomas Krigas observed that certain platinum compounds inhibited cell division, and by 1969 demonstrated that these compounds cured solid tumors, leading to the development of the leading chemotherapy drug that eventually resulted from this work, cisplatin.

Today, Michigan State continues its research with facilities such as the U.S. Department of Energy-sponsored MSU-DOE Plant Research Laboratory and a particle accelerator called the National Superconducting Cyclotron Laboratory. The Facility for Rare Isotope Beams (FRIB)—a $730M scientific user facility funded by the U.S. Department of Energy Office of Science, MSU, and the State of Michigan—will advance nuclear physics and provide research opportunities for scientists and students from around the globe. FRIB is expected to be fully operational in 2022 and is ahead of schedule. In 2004, scientists at the Cyclotron produced and observed a new isotope of the element germanium, called Ge-60. In 2004, Michigan State, in consortium with the University of North Carolina at Chapel Hill and the government of Brazil, broke ground on the 4.1-meter Southern Astrophysical Research Telescope (SOAR) in the Andes Mountains of Chile. The consortium telescope will allow the Physics & Astronomy department to study galaxy formation and origins. Since 1999, MSU has been part of another consortium called the Michigan Life Sciences Corridor, which aims to develop biotechnology research in the State of Michigan. The College of Communication Arts and Sciences' Quello Center researches current issues of information and communication management. Avida, an artificial life software platform to study the evolutionary biology of self-replicating and evolving computer programs, is under active development by Charles Ofria in the Digital Evolution Lab of the Department of Computer Science and Engineering. Albert Fert, an Adjunct professor at MSU, was awarded the 2007 Nobel Prize in Physics together with Peter Grünberg. In February 2010, a $25 million grant was awarded by the National Science Foundation to the university to develop a Bio/computational Evolution in Action Consortium (BEACON) within the Biomedical and Physical Sciences Building.

== Endowment ==
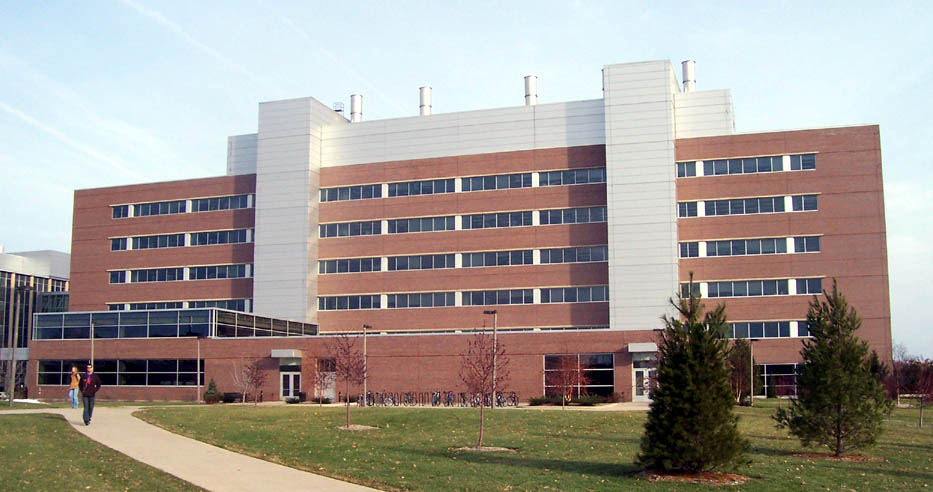
MSU's new Biomedical and Physical Sciences Building contains many laboratories and offices, several lecture halls, and a cafe.

MSU's (private, non-Morrill Act) endowment started in 1916 when the Engineering Building burned down. Automobile magnate R. E. Olds helped the program stay afloat with a gift of $100,000. While this opened the door for other types of private donations, MSU has often lagged behind peer institutions in terms of endowments. As recently as the early 1990s, MSU was last among the eleven Big Ten schools, with barely over $100 million in endowment funds. However, in the early 2000s, the university started a campaign to increase the size of the endowment. At the close of FY 2004–05, the endowment had risen to $1.325 billion, raising the university to sixth of the 11 Big Ten schools in terms of endowment; within $2M of the fifth-rated school. As of June 30, 2021, MSU's endowment had a market value of $4.4 billion.

== Programs ==
=== James Madison College ===
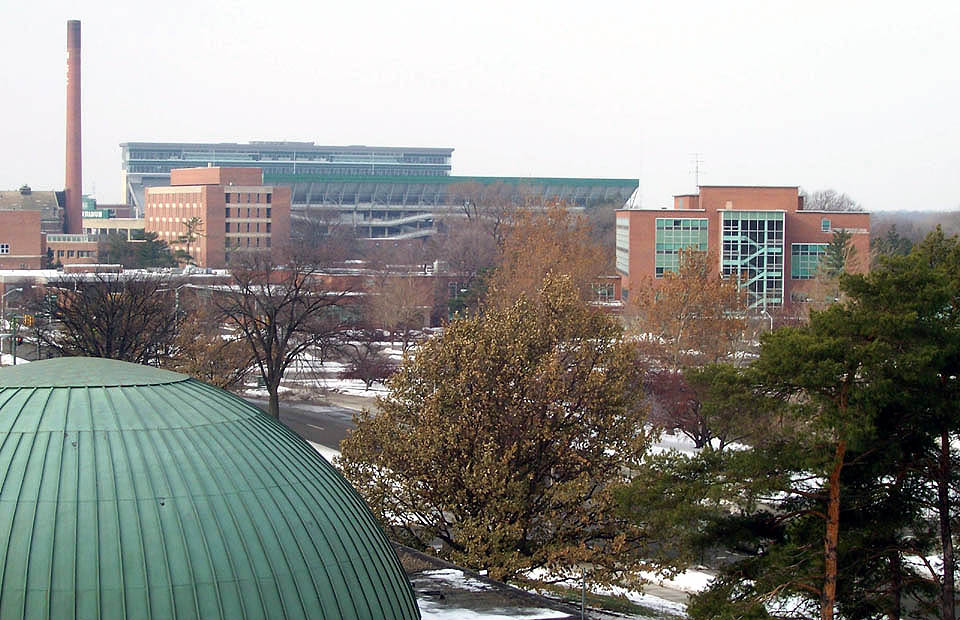
The South Campus skyline

James Madison College (JMC), one of MSU's three residential colleges, started in 1967. The concept behind Madison College was to merge the best attributes of a small public affairs college with the resources of a major university. Though JMC started as an experiment, it is now a well-respected liberal arts program. Madison admits about 320 students each year, holding the total student body around 1,150. Classes in the college are small, with an average of 25 students, and most instructors are tenure track faculty with PhDs or occasionally PhD candidates. As a residential college, JMC has its classrooms, offices, and student housing together in Case Hall. As part of its "living-learning" philosophy, JMC requires freshmen students to live in Case during their freshman year.

Madison offers majors, which students choose at the end of their freshman year. The four majors are Political Theory and Constitutional Democracy, International Relations, Social Relations and Policy, and Comparative Cultures and Politics. All of JMC's majors require two years of foreign language and one "field experience”, either in the form of an internship or study abroad program. James Madison College also has a fairly large amount of academically successful students. Madison boasts numerous major award recipients, including Rhodes, Truman, Fulbright and Marshall Scholars to name a few. About 15% of its students are in the Honors College and though JMC only represents about 4% of MSU graduates the college, they make up around 35% of the MSU's Phi Beta Kappa members.

=== Residential College in the Arts and Humanities ===
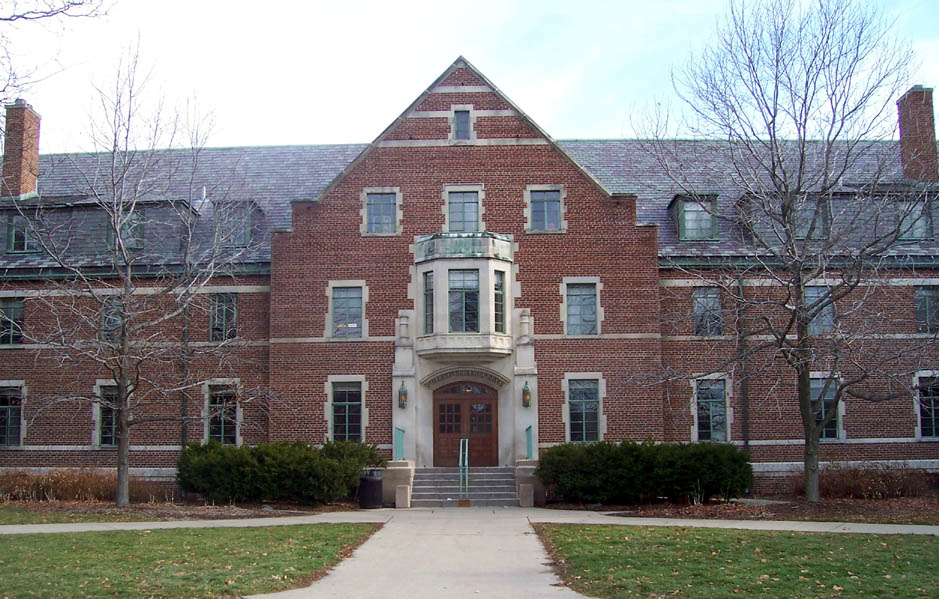
Snyder-Phillips Hall houses the Residential College in the Arts and Humanities (RCAH).

In 2007, MSU accepted its first class of students for the Residential College in the Arts and Humanities. Founded October 21, 2005, the college provides around 600 undergraduates with an individualized curriculum in the liberal, visual and performing arts. Though all the students will graduate with the same degree, MSU will encourage students in the college to get a second degree or specialization. The new college will be MSU's fourth residential college, after James Madison College, the Lyman Briggs School, and the now-defunct Justin Morrill College. Although early proposals named the college after Nelson Mandela, university officials have not decided on a permanent name as of 2006, saying that it is still too early to fix a permanent name to the college.

RCAH classes started in Fall 2007 in the Collegiate Gothic Snyder-Phillips Residence Hall. Built in 1947, Snyder-Phillips once housed Justin Morrill College. MSU renovated the dormitory to make room for the new college. Along with a new dining hall and upgraded bathrooms, the expanded Snyder-Phillips includes a 150-seat multipurpose classroom and performing arts space, a student art gallery, a Wi-Fi-enabled coffeeshop, music practice rooms, and a language learning center.

=== Lyman Briggs College ===
The Lyman Briggs College teaches math and science within social, historical and philosophical contexts. Founded in 1967 as Lyman Briggs College, it was merged into the College of Natural Science in 1981, though the college has now regained its full college status. Many Lyman Briggs students intend to pursue careers in medicine, but the school supports 37 coordinate majors, from human biology to computer science. Lyman Briggs is one of the few colleges that lets undergraduates teach as "Learning Assistants."

=== MSU College of Law ===
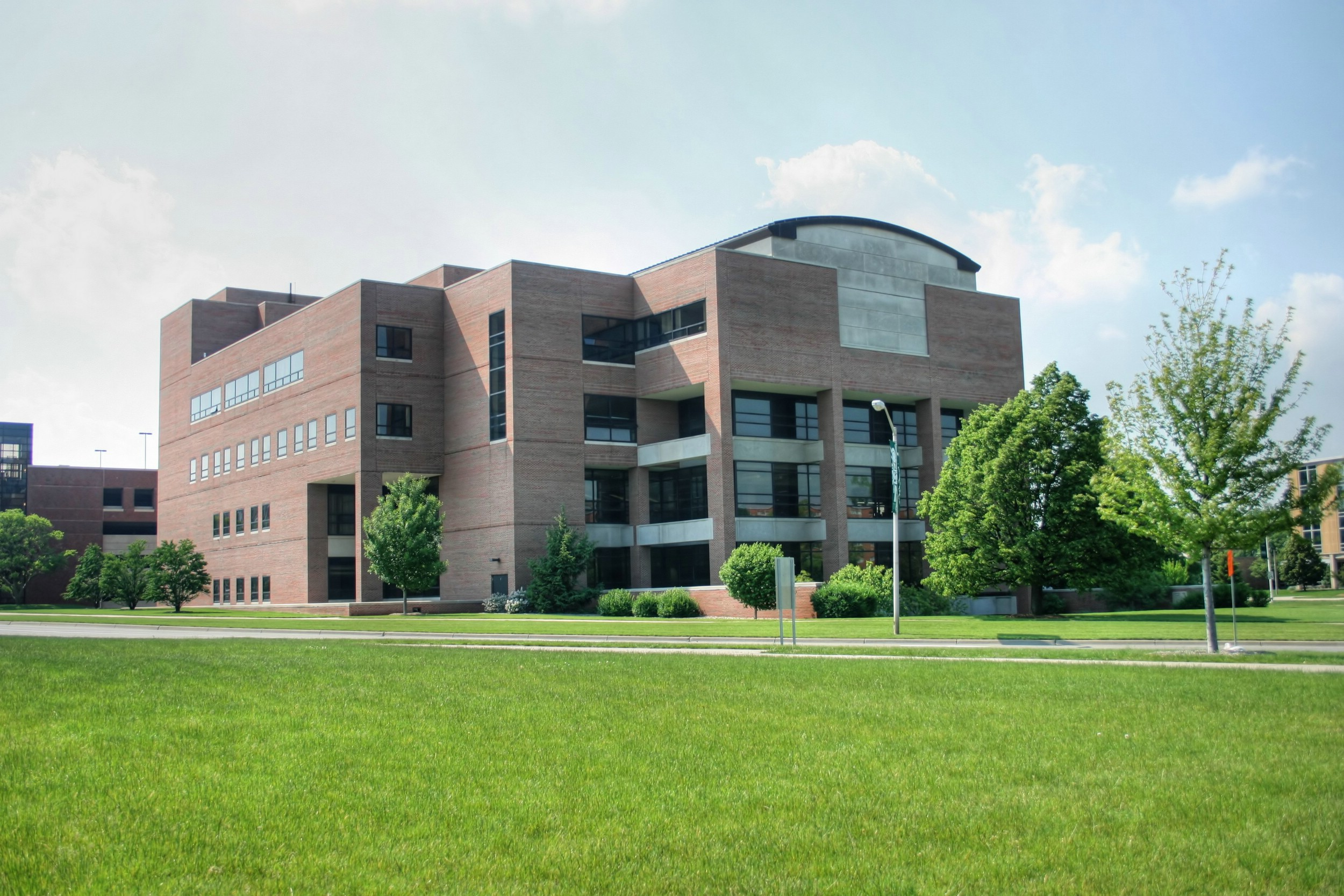
Michigan State's postmodern law building

The Michigan State University College of Law was founded in 1891. It was originally named Detroit College of Law, as it was the first law school founded in Detroit. Detroit College of Law became affiliated with Michigan State University in 1995 (changing its name to MSU College of Law), and began offering joint degree programs, including JD-MBA and various LLM programs. Students attending MSU College of Law come from 42 states and 13 countries, with applications tripling since affiliating with MSU in 1995. Full-time and part-time (night) students can participate in 8 concentrations, including the Trial Practice Institute. The law school publishes the Michigan State Law Review and several other journals.

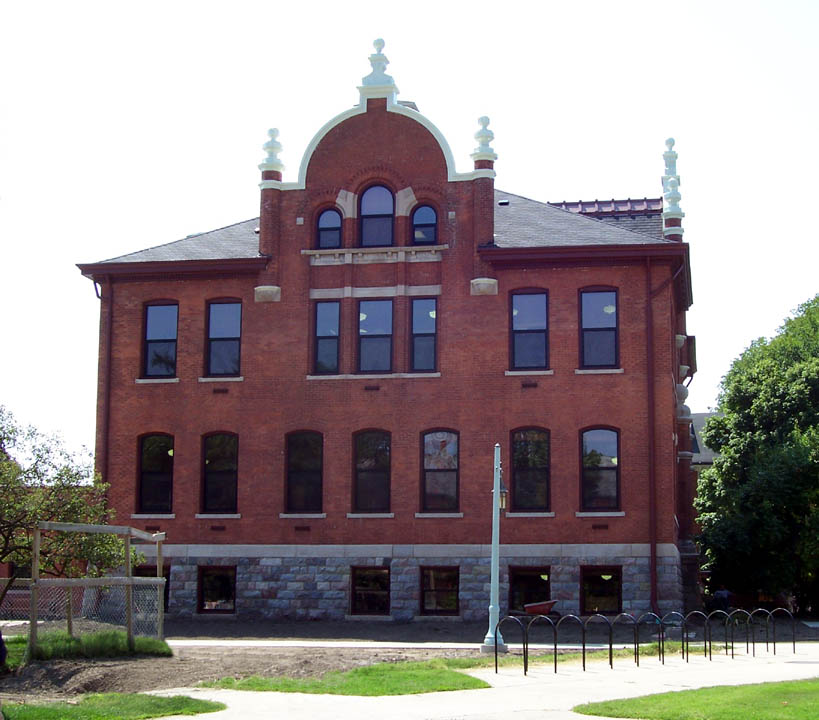
The newly renovated and renamed Marshall-Adams Hall is home to the Department of Economics.

The first trial practice institute in the United States, the Geoffrey Fieger Trial Practice Institute, started at Michigan State University College of Law with a grant of $4 million from Geoffrey Fieger. The Intellectual Property and Communications Law program is ranked number 1 among law schools in the Big Ten Conference, and number 17 in the United States. In addition, MSU College of Law's Indigenous Law Program offers an Indigenous Law Certificate Program.

=== Eli Broad College of Business ===
The Eli Broad College of Business has programs in accounting, information systems, finance, hospitality business, human resources management, management, marketing, and supply chain management. MSU's supply chain management program is currently ranked number one by the U.S. News & World Report. High school students who select a Broad major on the MSU Freshman application are considered for direct admission. Current undergraduate MSU students can apply to the Broad College through the secondary admission process. Applicants must fulfill specific academic and non-academic requirements as part of the application. The college has 2,066 admitted undergraduate students and 817 graduate students.

The School of Hospitality Business is an industry-specific school within the business college with separate admission statistics. It started with 18 students and now has 402 admitted undergraduate students, 34 graduate students, and 13 full-time faculty members.

The Eli Broad Graduate School of Management, which Forbes magazine ranks 19th in the U.S., offers 3 MBA programs, as well as joint degrees with the College of Law. Other master's programs include accounting, business analytics, finance, food service business management, hospitality business management, marketing research, and supply chain management.

The college has been accredited by the Association to Advance Collegiate Schools of Business (AACSB) since 1953.

=== Honors College ===
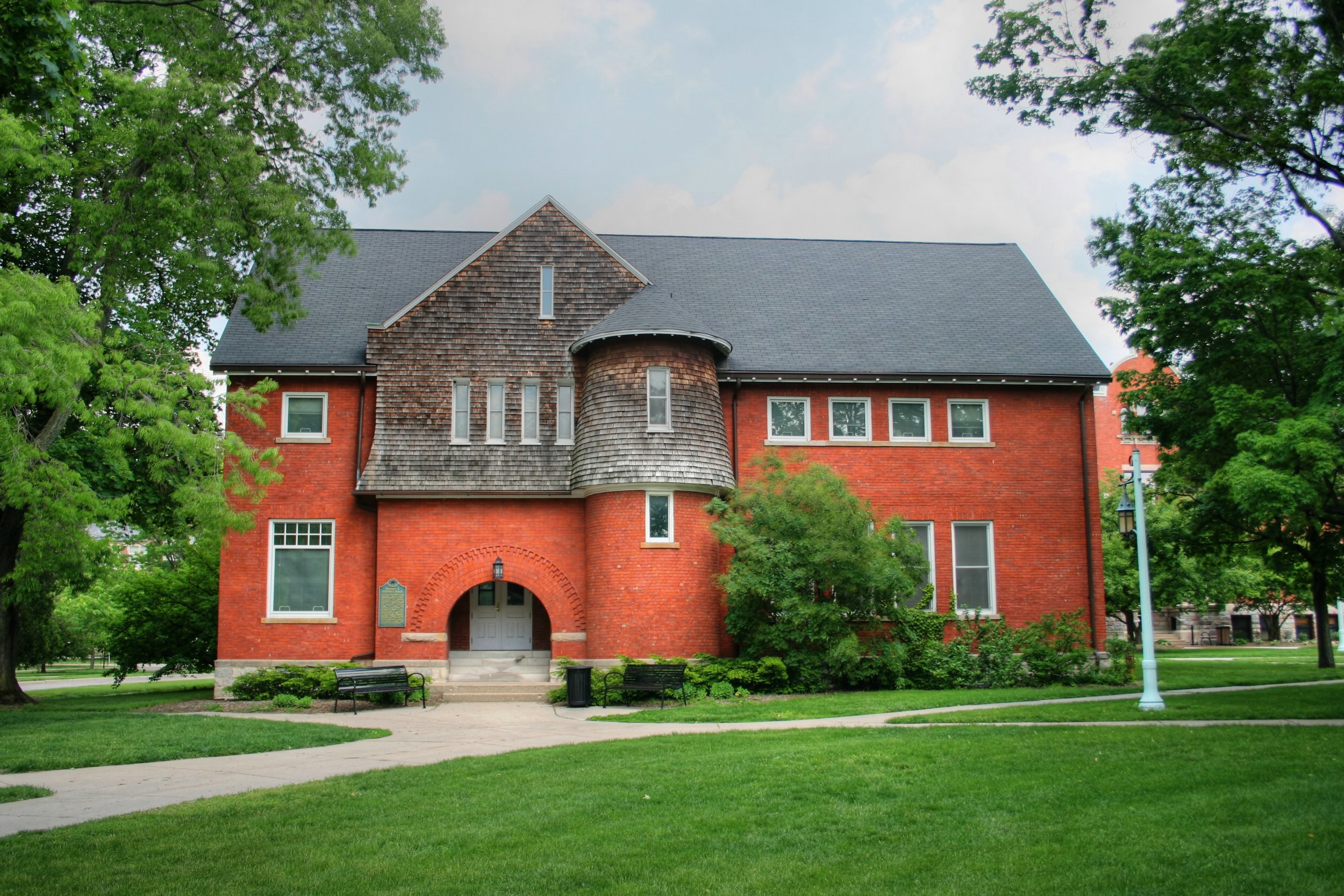
Eustace-Cole Hall

The Honors College was established in 1956 to provide more academic opportunities to MSU students, and to emphasize academic challenge and achievement. It is currently housed in Eustace-Cole Hall on the northern portion of MSU's campus.

Members of the Honors College at Michigan State University enjoy a great deal of freedom over their academic planning. They are allowed to skip prerequisites, substitute departmental courses for general education requirements, and enroll in Honors courses. Honors College members are also eligible to enroll in graduate courses. Upon graduation from the Honors College, a student receives an Honors College stole to wear at commencement.

=== Human Medicine ===
MSU opened the College of Human Medicine was founded in 1964. The main pre-clinical campus is located on Michigan State University's main campus in East Lansing, while half of the class studies at the Secchia Center in Grand Rapids. Clinical practice, undergraduate medical education during the clinical years three and four, graduate medical education, and research takes place across six campuses located in the Michigan cities of Flint, Grand Rapids, Lansing, Traverse City, Midland, and Marquette.

=== Osteopathic Medicine ===
Michigan State University College of Osteopathic Medicine was founded in 1969 as the first osteopathic medical school on a public university campus. The main pre-clinical campus is located in East Lansing, with two additional sites in Macomb and Detroit. Clerkship medical education takes place throughout Michigan in one of the many Statewide Campus System hospitals. Basic and clinical research takes places at all sites.

== Resources ==
=== Libraries ===
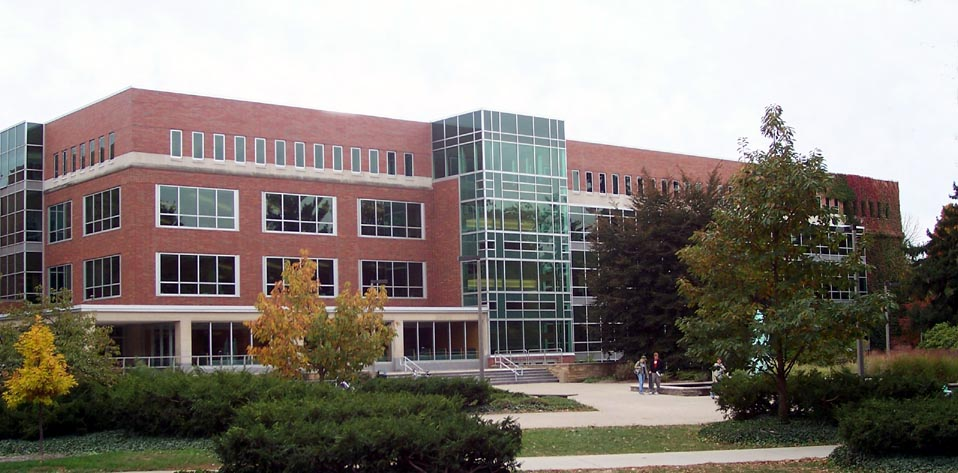
MSU's Main Library

The Michigan State University Library is the 26th largest academic library system in North America with over 4.7 million volumes and 6.4 million microforms. The university library comprises nine branch locations including the main library. The Africana Collection is one of the largest of its kind in the nation with a collection of over 200,000 items. Other significant collections include The G. Robert Vincent Voice Library, the largest academic voice library in the nation, containing a collection of over 40,000 hours of spoken word recordings and includes the voices of over 100,000 persons from all walks of life, and the Russel B. Nye Popular Culture Collections which includes the extensive Comic Art Collection. This collection currently includes over 100,000 comic books, and 10,000 related books and periodicals.

=== Press ===
Michigan State University Press is the publishing arm of Michigan State University. It traces its origins to the late 1940s when the Michigan State Board of Agriculture established a publishing program at Michigan State College (MSC). President John A. Hannah made a recommendation on publications to a special committee. In response, the committee members recommended to Hannah that Michigan State College Press be created. The president acted on their advice and on July 1, 1947, the publishing house came into being. In addition to its own publishing program, Michigan State University Press distributes books from The African Books Collective, a consortium of more than 110 African small and scholarly publishers headquartered in Oxford, England. They also publish books for four Canadian publishers, as wells as books from the National Museum of Science and Industry, London.
