= John Gallagher (journalist) =

American business journalist, author (b. 1949)

John T. Gallagher (born 1949) is an American retired business journalist and author. He lives in Detroit, Michigan, and worked at the Detroit Free Press newspaper for more than 30 years.

== Biography ==
John Gallagher was born in New York City. His first role was at the City News Bureau of Chicago, a cooperative news agency where he was able to learn about journalism while on the job. Gallagher joined the Democrat and Chronicle daily newspaper in Rochester, New York in 1978. This was followed by a role at The Post-Standard newspaper in Syracuse, New York.

Gallagher joined the Detroit Free Press newspaper in 1987, where he remained until 2019. Gallagher documented Detroit's history for more than three decades, including the history of the auto industry. He participated in the Detroit newspaper strike in 1995, as one of the members of the Newspaper Guild labor union. In 2017, he was inducted into the Michigan Journalist Hall of Fame, awarded by Michigan State University School of Journalism. After leaving his role at the Detroit Free Press in December 2019, Gallagher wrote an open letter to the people of Detroit. He wrote a 2022 article in Metromode about the history of discriminatory mortgage lending practices.

His book Reimagining Detroit: Opportunities for Redefining an American City (2010) posits ways for the shrinking city to improve. Gallagher's bookYamasaki in Detroit: A Search for Serenity (2015), is a biography of architect Minoru Yamasaki who designed multiple buildings in Detroit. Rust Belt Reporter: A Memoir (2024), is an autobiographical memoir in which Gallagher highlighted his hopeful ideas about Detroit's urban recovery, in light of the city's economic collapse and in an era which traditional newspaper publishing and journalism is in decline.

== Publications ==
=== Books authored ===
- Hill, Eric J.; Gallagher, John (November 2002). AIA Detroit: The American Institute of Architects Guide to Detroit Architecture. Balthazar Korab (photography). Wayne State University Press. ISBN 9780814331200.
- Gallagher, John (September 2008). Great Architecture of Michigan. Balthazar Korab (photography). Detroit, Michigan: Wayne State University Press. ISBN 9780981614403.
- Gallagher, John (2010). Reimagining Detroit: Opportunities for Redefining an American City. Detroit, Michigan: Wayne State University Press. ISBN 9780814334690. LCCN 2010016181.
- Gallagher, John (2013). Revolution Detroit: Strategies for Urban Reinvention. Detroit, Michigan: Wayne State University Press. ISBN 978-0-8143-3857-5.
- Gallagher, John (2015). Yamasaki in Detroit: A Search for Serenity. Detroit, Michigan: Wayne State University Press. ISBN 9780814341193. LCCN 2015935288.
- Gallagher, John (March 30, 2021). The Englishman and Detroit: A British Entrepreneur Helps Restore a City's Confidence. Parafine Press. ISBN 9781950843381.
- Gallagher, John (2024). Rust Belt Reporter: A Memoir. Stephen Henderson (forward). Detroit, Michigan: Wayne State University Press. ISBN 9780814351482.

=== Book contributions ===
- Ferry, W. Hawkins. The Buildings of Detroit: A History. John Gallagher (Forward). Detroit, Michigan: Wayne State University Press. ISBN 9780814316658.
