= James Birney =

James Birney may refer to:

- James G. Birney (1792–1857), abolitionist, candidate for the U.S. presidency on the Liberty Party ticket
- James M. Birney (1817–1888), Michigan politician, son of James G. Birney
