= Joseph R. Williams =

American politician (1808–1861)

Joseph Rickelson Williams
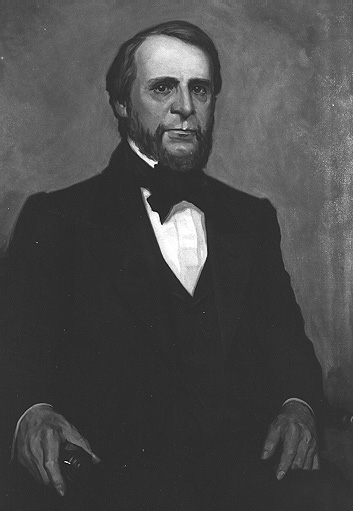
- Joseph R. Williams, President Agricultural College of the State of Michigan, 1857–1859

14th Lieutenant Governor of Michigan
- In office April 3, 1861 – June 15, 1861 (death)
- Governor: Austin Blair
- Preceded by: James M. Birney
- Succeeded by: Henry T. Backus

Member of the Michigan Senate from the 16th district
- In office January 2, 1861 – June 15, 1861
- Preceded by: Comfort Tyler
- Succeeded by: Henry H. Riley

Personal details
- Born: November 14, 1808 Taunton, Massachusetts, US
- Died: June 15, 1861 (aged 52) Constantine, Michigan, US
- Party: Whig; Republican Party
- Spouse: Sarah Rowland Langdon Williams
- Children: Charlotte Langdon Williams Kumler; Sibyl Williams Hamilto; Rebecca Williams Cooper
- Education: Harvard University
- Profession: Farmer; Attorney; Newspaper Publisher; Politician

Joseph Rickelson Williams (November 14, 1808 – June 15, 1861) was an American politician, a Republican Michigan Senate Senator, and the 14th lieutenant governor of Michigan. He was also the first president for the Agricultural College of the State of Michigan, now Michigan State University.

== Early life ==
Williams was born in Taunton, Massachusetts, attended Sandwich Academy where he studied under Luther Lincoln, and graduated from Harvard in 1831 with distinguished honors. He then studied law with John Davis in Worcester, was admitted to the bar and practiced in New Bedford. In 1839, he moved to Constantine, Michigan, where he resided for the rest of his life.

== Career ==
Because of ill health, Williams left his law practice and traveled to Toledo, Ohio, and served as the agent of a New England company seeking land investments until 1839 when he moved to Constantine, Michigan, where he invested in the construction and operation of flour mills, and was a member of the state constitutional convention of 1850, twice the Whig candidate for Congress, and twice the Whig candidate for the United States Senate against Lewis Cass. In May, 1853, Williams returned to Toledo and purchased the Toledo Blade, a local newspaper which under his management, became the leading advocate of Republican principles in Northern Ohio. In 1856, Williams sold the paper to Clark Waggoner and G.T. Steward in order to assume the duties of the first President of the Agricultural College of the State of Michigan when it opened in May, 1857. Williams resigned the position after serving for two years.

Williams was a passionate promoter of interdisciplinary liberal arts education. In accord with Williams' philosophy, the college offered a unique blending of practical and theoretical academics. Williams' curriculum balanced liberal arts, science and practical vocational studies. However, Williams excluded Latin and Greek studies from the early curriculum, which meant that these classical languages were not tested for admission given the college's overwhelmingly rural applicant base. Nevertheless, under Williams the college did require three hours of daily manual labor. The labor requirement helped students defray expenses, and cheaply clear and develop the campus while learning scientific principles from faculty-supervisors.

However, after just two years, Williams ran into conflict with the managing State Board of Education. Despite Williams' eloquent defense of an all-round education for the masses, the board saw the college as inefficient and had far deviated from the agriculture focus as the founder, John Clough Holmes, had anticipated. Indeed, some agriculturalists began protesting against the college's unpractical curriculum with some even calling for the college's abolition. After just two years at the helm, Williams resigned in 1859 under pressure. The Board then reduced the curriculum to a two-year, vocation-oriented farming program, which proved catastrophic and resulted almost overnight in a drastic reduction in enrollment. There was a high demand for an all-round education grounded in the liberal arts tradition instead of a specialized agriculture program, a fact the board disregarded. With a sharp decrease in tuition revenue, the college was soon in dire financial straits and threatened with dissolution.

In 1860, Williams was elected as a Republican to the Michigan Senate and chosen as president pro tempore of the state senate when he took office in 1861. After the resignation of Lieutenant Governor of Michigan James M. Birney, Williams took on the duties as the 14th Lieutenant Governor under Austin Blair.

During his brief time in office he helped pass the Reorganization Act of 1861. Williams' law mandated that the college return to a four-year curriculum and, additionally, have the power to grant master's degrees. Under the act, a newly created body known as the State Board of Agriculture took over from the State Board of Education in running the institution, giving the college the autonomy that it retains to this day.

With the college's future secure, Williams went to Washington D. C. to lobby for the passage of the Morrill Land-Grant Colleges Act amid a social movement calling for a publicly funded university system for the working class led by Jonathan Baldwin Turner.

== Death and legacy ==
Williams died suddenly of influenza at the age of fifty-two with only 73 days as acting lieutenant governor. President Abraham Lincoln signed the bill the following year. Eight years after his death, Joseph Williams was memorialized on the campus of State Agricultural College with the 1869 construction of Williams Hall, a men's dormitory. The building burned on January 1, 1919. The university replaced it with the current Williams Hall in 1937 as a women's dormitory named for his wife Sarah.

== Family life ==
Captain Richard Williams, a highly respected shipmaster, and Rebecca (Smith) Williams were his parents, and on May 28, 1844, he married Sarah Rowland Langdon, a daughter of John Langdon, in Buffalo, New York. They had three daughters, Charlotte Langdon Williams Kumler, Sibyl Williams Hamilto, and Rebecca Williams Cooper.

== See also ==
- List of presidents of Michigan State University

Political offices
Preceded by James M. Birney	(acting) Lieutenant Governor of Michigan; April 3 – June 15, 1861	Succeeded by Henry T. Backus

Academic offices
Preceded by n/a	President of Agricultural College of the State of Michigan; 1857–1859	Succeeded by Lewis R. Fiske
