= Elizabeth H. Simmons =

American theoretical physicist

- Education: Harvard University; University of Cambridge
- Scientific career
- Fields: Particle physics
- Workplaces: University of California, San Diego; Michigan State University; Boston University; Harvard University

Elizabeth H. Simmons is an American theoretical physicist, and Executive Vice Chancellor at University of California San Diego. Formerly, she was a distinguished professor of physics at Michigan State University, the dean of Lyman Briggs College, and the associate provost for faculty and academic staff development. She has also held positions at Harvard University and Boston University. Simmons is married to fellow physicist R. Sekhar Chivukula.

== Education ==
Simmons grew up in New Jersey and as a high school senior, got her first exposure to experimental physics doing a project at AT&T Bell Laboratories She earned her bachelor's degree in physics at Harvard University in 1985, followed a master's degree in physics from the University of Cambridge as a Churchill Scholar. At the University of Cambridge she focused on condensed matter theory, writing her thesis on the origins and symmetry of some incommensurate phases, under the direction of Dr. Volker Heine. Simmons would return to Harvard University for her PhD in physics with a focus on particle theory, in which Simmons wrote her thesis on electroweak and flavor symmetry breaking, under the direction of Howard Georgi.

== Career ==
From 1990 to 1993, Simmons was a postdoctoral fellow in the Department of Physics at Harvard University, where she specialized in theoretical particle physics.

In 1993, Simmons became an assistant professor of physics at Boston University. Promoted to associate professor in 1998, she remained at Boston University until 2003, and during that time served as associate chair for undergraduate studies (2001–2003). In 2002, Simmons became the director of Boston University's Learning Resource Network for Pre-College Outreach.

Simmons moved to Michigan State University in 2003, where she became a professor of physics and dean of Lyman Briggs College. In 2013, Michigan State named Simmons a University Distinguished Professor of Physics. She became the acting dean of the College of Arts and Letters for the 2014–15 year. In 2016, Michigan State appointed Simmons the associate provost for faculty and academic staff development.

In 2017, Simmons moved to the University of California San Diego, to serve as the Executive Vice Chancellor for Academic Affairs and a Distinguished Professor of Physics.

From 2004 to 2007, Simmons served as Corporate Secretary of the Aspen Center for Physics. She later became an Honorary General Member of the institution.

== Work on outreach and inclusion in science ==
=== Women in STEM ===
"Elizabeth Simmons is a strong advocate for the advancement of women scholars in mathematics and science...", a quote from Dr. Lou Anna K. Simon, president of Michigan State University. One way that Simmons advocates for this advancement is through public speaking. Simmons argues that there are several contributing factors adding to the issue of gender inequity in STEM field—such as implicit bias, gender schema, and stereotype threat. Simmons proposes several solutions to some of these factors, which include increasing aware of implicit bias, promoting diversity for the betterment of STEM, and promoting gender-neutral parental leave.

=== QUEST ===
In addition to public speaking, Simmons and her husband founded Quantum Education for Students and Teachers, better known as QUEST. QUEST is an outreach program, through Michigan State University, with the purpose of "sharing the fun and excitement of quantum physics with educators, students, and the general public".

- List of Local Outreach Activities
  - East Lansing Girls’ Math Science Conference
  - MSU Grandparents University
  - MSU Lyman Briggs College's Spartan Science Day
  - MSU Physics and Astronomy Research Opportunities for Undergraduates
  - MSU Physics and Astronomy Society of Physics Students
  - MSU Visiting International Professionals Programs
- List of National Organizations Sponsoring Outreach Activities
  - APS Division of Particles and Fields
  - Aspen Center for Physics
  - LHC Theory Initiative
  - QuarkNet
  - Summer Science Program, Inc.

=== LGBT physicists ===
Also, Elizabeth Simmons is a current member of the Ad-Hoc Committee on LGBT Issues for the American Physical Society. The purpose of this committee is to look into issues relevant to LGBT, and other sexual- and gender-minority physicists. The committee is responsible for investigating their (LGBT persons) “representation in physics, assess the educational and professional climate in physics, recommend changes in policies and practices that impact LGBT physicists, and address other issues that affect inclusion.” In March 2016, the Ad-Hoc Committee on LGBT Issues released their full report. The report covered several issues faced by the LGBT community, and touched on several possible recommendations.

== Research ==
Simmons is a theoretical particle physicist, and her research focuses on the origins of the masses of the elementary subatomic particles.

== Honors and awards ==
During Simmons’ time at Boston University, she was honored with the American Association of University Women (Curie) Fellowship. The fellowships granted by the AAUW support female scholars who are completing dissertations, planning research, and preparing research for publication. In 2002, Simmons was awarded the United Methodist Church Scholar/Teacher of the Year. This award acknowledges outstanding scholars for their dedication to learning and to the institution. Later, in 2005, Simmons presented with the ACE Michigan Distinguished Women in Higher Education Leadership Award—which is the highest honor given by the Michigan-ACE Network., More recently, in February 2012, the American Physical Society named Simmons the Women Physicist of the Month. The following year (2013) Simmons was awarded the Robert F. Banks Award for Institutional Leadership—an award reserved for any faculty member in recognition of extraordinary and sustained leadership that advances Michigan State University's commitment to connectivity, quality, and inclusion.,
