= John Clough Holmes =

American academic (1809–1887)

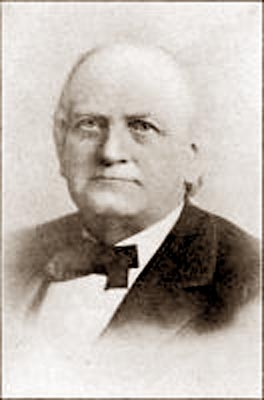
- John Clough Holmes, January 1883
- Born: September 25, 1809; Salem, Massachusetts
- Died: December 16, 1887 (aged 78)
- Known for: Established Michigan State University

John Clough Holmes (September 25, 1809 – December 16, 1887) was an American agriculturalist, educator, and co-founder of the Michigan State Agricultural Society. Holmes is also known as the founder of Michigan State University, established in 1855 as an agriculture college, the first of its kind in the United States. Holmes Hall, the home of the Lyman Briggs College, is named in his honor.

Born in Massachusetts, Holmes moved to Michigan at age 26. He married into a merchant family and later got involved in both the Detroit Horticultural Society and the Board of Education. In 1849, his background in horticulture and education led him to co-found the Michigan State Agricultural Society, a group dedicated to establishing a state-funded agricultural college in Michigan. Holmes spent the next six years drafting legislation and gaining support for his cause, and in 1855, the Michigan state governor signed a bill establishing the Agricultural College of the State of Michigan.

Holmes was keenly involved with the details of the Agricultural College, influencing everything from the purchase of land for the campus, layout of the buildings, and even the placement of the chairs and tables. Once the college opened, he assumed the role of treasurer and later Professor of Horticulture. By 1861, Holmes had fallen out of favor with the other College administrators, and retired to his home in Detroit. Nevertheless, he continued to support and visit the college until his death in 1887.

== Biography ==
Born in Salem, Massachusetts, Holmes moved to Michigan in 1835, and gained employment in a Detroit merchant store. Within five years he had married his boss's daughter, and soon became a partner in the family business. Holmes served as president of the Detroit Horticultural Society in 1847. The following two years he was a member of the Board of Education of Detroit. Then in 1849 he co-founded the Michigan State Agricultural Society.

The Michigan State Agricultural Society immediately assumed a lofty goal to foster the establishment of an agricultural college in Michigan. Holmes, who served as secretary of the Agricultural Society from 1849 to 1857, was also the college's most tenacious proponent. In conference with his fellow society members, he drafted a bill that would create the college. Significantly, Holmes vehemently admonished that this college be independent of the University of Michigan for he "feared that agricultural studies would not receive the attention needed to survive and thrive" at those schools.

Holmes spent the next five years gathering supporters for his movement, traveling at his own expense to gather petition signatures from across the state. On January 14, 1855, Holmes went to the state capital of Lansing to lobby the legislature for an agricultural college. He spent the next four weeks championing the bill he wrote and cementing support in both the House of Representatives and the Senate. Though many legislators supported the basic concept of a state-funded agricultural college, there was strong opposition from University of Michigan president Henry Tappan, who wanted the agriculture program to be part of his school. Nevertheless, Holmes prevailed. On February 12, 1855, Michigan Governor Kinsley S. Bingham signed Act 130, establishing the Agricultural College of the State of Michigan, the school that would become Michigan State University. The final draft of the bill held only two significant differences from the one that Holmes presented: that the purchase price not exceed US $15 per acre, rather than the $25 Holmes desired; and that the site must be within ten miles (16 km) of Lansing, a provision added to silence the various factions that wanted the new college built in their own backyards.

Holmes' work had only begun: Act 130 put the Agricultural Society wholly in charge of selecting the site for the Agricultural College. In June 1855, Holmes and the society's executive committee visited nine sites of offered land, including some near the present towns of Holt, Millett, DeWitt, and Haslett. As a result of the low stipulated price of $15 per acre, all of the sites were uncleared land, and many were quite untenable for a campus. Eventually, Holmes wrote the proposal to purchase the 677 acres (274 ha) Burr farm, located three miles due east of the capitol. He also included a second proposal, outlining both the college's organization and "specific appointments for a staff."

The State Board of Education approved the site purchase in July 1855, but months later had proven unable to make any progress in deciding on basics for the college—including what buildings it might require. The Board turned to Holmes, who had continued to acquaint himself with the site by making some preliminary surveys. After some consideration, he reported back to the Board that the school required two main buildings: a combination classroom and office building, and a dormitory. Thus, John C. Holmes is the man responsible for the design of both College Hall and the original dormitory, now known as Saints' Rest. In addition, although Professor Harold W. Lautner (who, as the official Director of Campus Planning from 1945 to 1969, was a direct successor to Holmes) makes a point of noting that "who proposed the sites for these first buildings is not answered in any record," he concurs that Holmes' ubiquitous hand makes it unlikely that anyone else made that decision.

The buildings were completed, and the first classes commenced in May 1857. As the college began operations, Holmes was appointed its treasurer. Showing that no decision was small enough to escape his view, he is said to have "supervised the placing of chairs and tables in College Hall." The college's 200-volume library was donated by the Michigan State Agricultural Society—curiously, this meant that Holmes (as secretary of the society) had conveyed the library to himself (as treasurer of the college).

In addition to treasurer, Holmes was appointed as the school's first superintendent of horticulture, responsible for campus planning and planting. This title was used alternately with Professor for a short period. On February 2, 1858, the Horticulture Professorship was suspended, ostensibly for financial reasons (as well as the fact that the wild condition of the land hardly warranted a full-time horticulturalist as yet). Even so, Holmes was allowed to continue residing in one of the original on-campus Faculty Row houses until the end of the term.

Then, on March 8, 1859, Holmes was asked to resign as treasurer, and he complied. Some time in that year or the one following, he was appointed once again as Superintendent of Horticulture, guiding students in planting the college gardens and improving the grounds. Through 1861 he continued to be listed in the college catalog under various titles including Professor of Horticulture, Secretary, and Treasurer.

== Legacy ==
In 1861, a major reorganization of the college transferred control from the Board of Education to the newly formed Board of Agriculture. Holmes was "not retained despite the urging of his colleagues and the unquestioned spiritual debt which the College owed him." Holmes returned to the Detroit area, lived another twenty-six years, and remained active in his community. Although he continued to be, as President T. C. Abbot wrote circa 1883, "a not infrequent and always welcome visitor at the college, and one of its warmest friends," Holmes never again held any official position at the college. There is no known explanation for this change of fortune, but as Lautner wrote, "clearly there were troubles here other than financial ones that are not suggested in the minutes."

Professor Lautner contrasts Holmes' legacy with that of John Harvard, whose donation of a modest library and four hundred British pounds led to a major university that bears his name, implying that MSU's debt to Holmes is far greater. Professor William J. Beal called him "the most important agent" of the school, while President Abbot said, "To no one man is the College so much indebted as John Clough Holmes." One hundred years after the founding, college historian Madison Kuhn's high regard for Holmes was clear, using as the frontispiece of his book a painting clearly meant to signify the exact moment of the Agricultural College's genesis with an almost mythological glow. Finally in 1965, MSU named a new six story modernist residence hall after Holmes. The building still stands to this day, and is home to the Lyman Briggs College.
