= M. Peter McPherson =

American political advisor

Peter McPherson
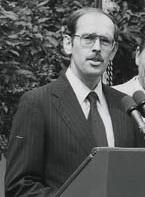
- McPherson in the White House Rose Garden, 1981

President of Michigan State University
- In office October 1, 1993 – December 31, 2004
- Preceded by: Gordon Guyer
- Succeeded by: Lou Anna Simon

United States Secretary of the Treasury
- Acting
- In office August 17, 1988 – September 15, 1988
- President: Ronald Reagan
- Preceded by: Jim Baker
- Succeeded by: Nick Brady

3rd United States Deputy Secretary of the Treasury
- In office October 15, 1987 – January 20, 1989
- President: Ronald Reagan
- Preceded by: Richard G. Darman
- Succeeded by: John E. Robson

8th Administrator of the United States Agency for International Development
- In office February 27, 1981 – August 7, 1987
- President: Ronald Reagan
- Preceded by: Douglas J. Bennet
- Succeeded by: Alan Woods

Personal details
- Born: Melville Peter McPherson; October 27, 1940 (age 85) Grand Rapids, Michigan, U.S.
- Party: Republican
- Education: Michigan State University (BA); Western Michigan University (MBA); American University (JD)

Melville Peter McPherson (born October 27, 1940) is president emeritus of the Association of Public and Land-grant Universities. He previously served as a special assistant to President Gerald Ford, administrator of USAID under President Ronald Reagan, Deputy Secretary of the U.S. Department of Treasury, President of Michigan State University from 1993 to 2004, and Chairman of Dow Jones.

== Early life, education, and personal life ==
McPherson was born in Grand Rapids, Michigan. McPherson received his undergraduate degree from Michigan State University in 1963. Returning from the Peace Corps, McPherson earned a master's in business administration from Western Michigan University in 1967 and a law degree from American University in Washington in 1969. McPherson's wife, Joanne, died in June 2022. They had four children and seven grandchildren.

== Peace Corps service ==
His public service career began as a Peace Corps volunteer in Peru, where during 1964 and 1965 he spent 18 months in Lima running a food distribution program and setting up credit unions. He called the experience a defining moment and said his experience in the Peace Corps helped him learn how to adapt. "When I was a Peace Corps volunteer, it was just a different culture," McPherson said. "I found I couldn't be a gringo and be effective. It's just a matter of asking people what they want to get done, finding out what the formal and informal rules are and figuring out ways to do things differently, while doing practical work in that environment. But that process was a challenge."

== Service in Ford and Reagan Administrations ==
After law school, he worked for the Internal Revenue Service, where his specialty was international taxation. He joined the administration of fellow Michigander Gerald Ford in 1975 as special assistant to the President and Deputy Director, Presidential Personnel Office. Dick Cheney was White House Chief of Staff.

After his government service in the Ford administration, he joined a private law practice as managing partner of the Washington office of Vorys, Sater, Seymour and Pease, an Ohio law firm.

In November 1980, he was named General Counsel to the Reagan-Bush transition.

McPherson held several high-level positions in President Ronald Reagan's administration. He was White House Counsel for the early weeks of the Reagan presidency.

He served as administrator of USAID from 1981 to 1987 where he led the U.S. response to the Great Famine in Africa in 1984–85. During that famine, the U.S. delivered 2 million tons of food to Africa in a 12-month period. With UNICEF, he and USAID led the worldwide effort to deal with diarrhea and dehydration, then the biggest killer of children in the developing world. This involved massive increase in the use of Oral Rehydration Therapy (ORT) and saved millions of lives: "At AID, you learn the process of deciding as a group large issues," McPherson said. McPherson's interest in world humanitarian and agricultural issues has made a difference for millions of people. While administrator of USAID he was also chair of the board of the Overseas Private Investment Corporation. McPherson is also widely considered one of the most effective administrators of USAID.

McPherson served as Deputy Secretary of the U.S. Treasury Department from 1987 to 1989. At Treasury, he was one of the three U.S. negotiators in the final weeks for the U.S.-Canada Free Trade Agreement in 1988.

After his service in the Reagan administration, McPherson was a Group Executive Vice President for Bank of America. His responsibilities included renegotiating the bank's $8 billion trouble debt with developing countries, managing the bank's operations in Latin America and Canada, and managing the bank's global private banking. Also at the bank, he was a member of the U.S. banking industry committee that advised the Federal Deposit Insurance Corporation in the restructuring of its financial structure. He chaired the U.S. banking industry committee that advised the U.S. government on the negotiations of NAFTA, the trade agreement between the U.S., Mexico and Canada.

== President of Michigan State University ==
In 1993 he was selected to become President of Michigan State University from 171 publicly identified candidates, effective October 1.

During his tenure as President of MSU, the school's international undergraduate study program became the nation's largest. McPherson also gets credit as the only president of a major university to keep tuition at the rate of inflation through a Tuition Guarantee plan. He led a $1 billion capital fund-raising campaign and brought a private law school to the 45,000-student campus. He developed the idea and was a leader of the Michigan Life Sciences Corridor that provided grants for research and commercialization of intellectual property. McPherson officially retired from MSU at the end of 2004.

While at Michigan State, he chaired the Blue Ribbon Committee to review the Lansing School System, chaired the State of Michigan Committee to Review Charter Schools and chair the Blue Ribbon Mid-Michigan Committee to review children's issues from birth to age five. Ironically, abuse of female student athletics by a team physician Larry Nassar occurred during the later years of McPherson's time at Michigan State, but there is no evidence that any reports of the abuse were reported to him before he retired at the end of 2004. Nassar was convicted in 2018.

McPherson took a five-month leave of absence as President of MSU in 2003 to serve as the Director of Economic Policy for the Office of Reconstruction and Humanitarian Assistance in Iraq, where he reopened the country's banks, helped establish a central bank, and helped put in place develop a new currency. In August 2004, McPherson was among five recipients presented with the Distinguished Service Award by U.S. Treasury Secretary John Snow for his service in Iraq.

== Chairman of Dow Jones ==
In February 2007 Dow Jones & Co. named McPherson chairman of the company during its annual shareholding meeting on April 18. McPherson replaced Peter Kann who earlier had announced his retirement. McPherson had served as an independent director of Dow Jones since 1998.

As Chairman of Dow Jones & Co., McPherson was deeply involved in the negotiations with Rupert Murdoch over Murdoch's plan to purchase the ‘'Wall Street Journal’'.

The Financial Times reported on December 13, 2007, that McPherson led the final annual meeting of Dow Jones where stockholders voted to approve the $5-billion sale of the 125-year-old company including the Wall Street Journal to Rupert Murdoch's News Corp. "I know I speak for so many today when I say that this has been a difficult—and for many—a sad set of discussions," said McPherson, offering "great expectations and hopes" for the future.

== President of APLU ==
McPherson served as president of the Association of Public and Land-grant Universities (APLU), the nation's oldest higher education association, from 2006 to 2022. During his tenure, McPherson has expanded the association's federal advocacy and worked on efforts aimed at boosting degree completion, enhancing transparency and accountability, strengthening university's research enterprise, and expanding community and economic engagement. He retired on September 1, 2022.

McPherson spearheaded the creation of APLU's Powered by Publics: Scaling Student Success initiative, which launched in November 2018. The effort is convening 130 change-ready institutions within 16 “transformation clusters” – reaching 3 million undergraduate students, including 1 million Pell Grant recipients. The effort is aiming to increase college access, eliminate the achievement gap, and award hundreds of thousands more degrees by 2025. It represents the largest-ever such collaborative work. APLU is broadly sharing lessons from the collaboration to help spur student-centered transformation across the sector.

McPherson has also championed a range of transparency and accountability efforts. In 2007, he led APLU's role in co-founding the Voluntary System of Accountability – which was designed to enable institutions to demonstrate their voluntary commitment to publishing access, cost, and student outcomes measures for the benefit of the public, prospective students, and lawmakers. The VSA has since evolved into a data analytics tool for universities to improve their strategic planning and decision making. Building on those efforts, APLU co-founded the Student Achievement Measure (SAM) in 2014 to provide a more complete understanding of student success at universities. SAM was created to address flawed federal education data that only counts first-time, full-time students who receive federal financial aid.

Another focus of McPherson's leadership has been the expansion of community and economic engagement efforts. In 2013, APLU launched the Innovation and Economic Prosperity (IEP) Designation and Awards program to recognize universities that are leaders in spurring and promoting regional economic development. Participating institutions complete a rigorous self-study process and earn the IEP designation if enough benchmarks are met. More than 60 universities have received the designation.

His leadership of APLU has also included a permanent partnership with the Coalition of Urban Serving Universities (USU) in an effort to incubate and promulgate the reforms necessary to help public urban research universities best serve their rapidly changing student populations. USU works with these institutions to pilot, refine, and share the most effective practices to accelerate innovation across higher education. Its work is centered on recruiting, admitting, retaining, and graduating high‐need, traditionally at‐risk students while reducing costs, reexamining campus business models, and fostering mutually beneficial campus‐community engagements.

APLU established the Peter McPherson Lifetime Achievement Award at the end of his tenure to honor an individual whose career has been dedicated to the service and leadership of public and land-grant universities. Nancy Zimpher won the inaugural award in 2023.

Immediately after McPherson retired from APLU, he organized and led a task force of other higher education leaders that developed standards for individual universities to use in providing prospective students information on the costs of attendance.

== Other activities ==
McPherson was a founding co-chair of the Partnership to Cut Hunger and Poverty in Africa. For 15 years McPherson was Chair of the HarvestPlus (H+)Project Advisory Board. H+ breeds crops to fortify them with vitamin A, zinc, and Iron, and it continues it work with these crops. Now, McPherson is the Co-Chair of the Board of HarvestPlus Solutions, a parallel organization that helps distributes these seeds in the developing world.

He is a former member of the Board of Trustees of the Gerald R. Ford Foundation. He was a member of the International Board of Advisors of Komatsu Company, a Japanese equipment manufacturer. He served on the board of Conservation International. McPherson is also a Member of the Board of Directors of Inter-American Dialogue and Chair of the Board’s Committee for Budget and Investments. Inter-American Dialogue.

McPherson is a member of the Board of Visitors of Virginia State University, a HBCU and a 1890 land-grant university. McPherson is also Chair of the Board of Directors of the International Foundation for Electoral Systems (IFES), an organization that advises on election processes in foreign countries, largely developing countries.

=== BIFAD Chair ===
McPherson was appointed in 2002 by President George W. Bush as the chairman to the Board for International Food and Agricultural Development (BIFAD). BIFAD advises USAID on the topics of food and agricultural safety in the developing world. He was succeeded in 2007 by Robert Easter.

== Awards ==
McPherson has been awarded:

- U.S. Presidential Certificate of Outstanding Achievement for “continued demonstrated vision, initiative and leadership in efforts to achieve a world without hunger.”
- Secretary of State Distinguished Leadership Award
- Secretary of Treasury Alexander Hamilton Award
- Honorary Doctorates from several universities
- UNICEF award for Outstanding Contributions to Child Survival
- Jewish National Fund Tree of Life Award
- National Public Service Award from the American Society for Public Administration
- Banker of the Year Award for Lifetime Achievement from the Bankers Association for Finance and Trade

Political offices
Preceded by Douglas J. Bennet	Administrator of the United States Agency for International Development; 1981–1987	Succeeded by Alan Woods
Preceded by Richard G. Darman	United States Deputy Secretary of the Treasury; Acting; 1987–1989	Succeeded by John E. Robson
Preceded by Jim Baker	United States Secretary of the Treasury; Acting; 1988	Succeeded by Nick Brady
Academic offices
Preceded by Gordon Guyer	President of Michigan State University; 1993–2004	Succeeded by Lou Anna Simon
