= Lyman Briggs College =

Residential college at Michigan State University

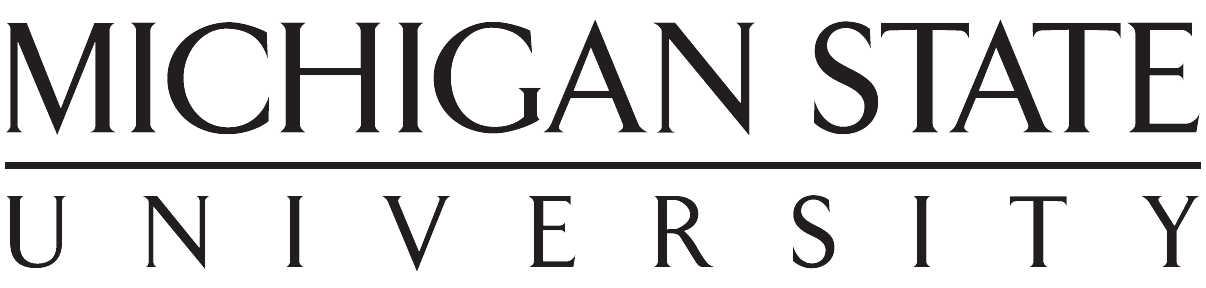
- Location: East Lansing, Michigan, U.S.
- Established: 1967
- Named for: Lyman James Briggs
- Dean: Kendra Spence Cheruvelil [Interim]
- Undergraduates: 1900 (approximate)
- Website: lbc.msu.edu

The Lyman Briggs College (LBC) is a residential college located at Michigan State University in East Lansing, Michigan, United States. Established as a residential college in 1967, Lyman Briggs was a residential school within the College of Natural Sciences from 1981 to 2007, and returned to residential college status in 2007.

== Purpose and history ==
The college is named in honor of Lyman James Briggs, who attended Michigan State Agricultural College from 1889 to 1893.

Lyman Briggs College addresses the modern dilemma described by C. P. Snow's "Two Cultures" by educating STEM students in the natural sciences as well as the humanities and social sciences, effectively attempting to create a curriculum of "liberal sciences." Science classes offered by LBC include chemistry, biology, physics, and math, and classes in the history, philosophy, and sociology of science. All of these classes reveal science's relationship with society, literature, history, and philosophy. Smaller class sizes allow for more interaction with professors, and LBC professors are leaders in discipline-based education research (DBER) and the scholarship of teaching and learning (SOTL).

Lyman Briggs College is located in Holmes Hall (named for MSU founder John Clough Holmes), the largest residence hall on campus. Many of the over 1250 students in the residence hall are members of LBC. Many of the students in the Lyman Briggs program intend to pursue careers in medicine, but there are a variety of other programs that are supported by Lyman Briggs. In all, there are over 30 coordinate majors, from human biology to computer sciences. LBC also has the unique distinction of being one of the few major schools to allow undergraduate students to assist in the classroom as "Learning Assistants." Learning Assistants run supervised recitations and labs in chemistry, biology, math, and physics.

Lyman Briggs College was made a school (i.e., a sub-unit) of the College of Natural Sciences in 1981 when the university was experiencing significant financial stress, with a name change to Lyman Briggs School of Science. In 2007, the school went through the formal process of regaining its status as a residential college, "in time for the school's 40th anniversary in the fall [of 2007]." The proposal to change its status was unanimously approved by the Faculty Council on April 10, 2007, presented to the Academic Council on April 17, 2007, and approved by the MSU Board of Trustees on June 15, 2007. The school's director, Elizabeth H. Simmons, was appointed dean and served through academic year 2016-2017. Mark Largent served as interim dean for academic year 2017-2018. Michele H. Jackson served as Dean from 2018-2020. Currently, Kendra Spence Cheruvelil is acting dean on an interim basis.

LBC partners with the James Madison College (JMC) and the MSU Department of Fisheries and Wildlife in the Science, Technology, Environment, and Public Policy specialization, which is based in JMC and offers a minor. LBC also partners with MSU's College of Arts and Letters to host the Bioethics minor.

== Relation to other MSU residential colleges ==
The James Madison College at Michigan State University was founded in the same year on the same principle of residential college, but in the area of public policy, political theory, and the liberal arts. Madison and Briggs Colleges collaborate with the Department of Fisheries and Wildlife in offering an undergraduate specialization in Science, Technology, the Environment, and Public Policy (STEPPS). Students in the two colleges enjoy friendly competition through the annual fall Canoe Race and spring Olympics.

In fall 2007, Michigan State opened a new Residential College in the Arts and Humanities. RCAH is collaborating with Madison and Briggs Colleges on a 21st Century Chautauqua, co-sponsored by the American Association of Colleges and Universities.
