= Jonathan L. Snyder =

Jonathan L. Snyder (November 29, 1859 – November 23, 1918) was president of the U.S. state of Michigan's State Agricultural College (now Michigan State University) from 1896 to 1915. Snyder Hall, part of the Snyder–Phillips building in the Red Cedar residential complex, is named in his honor; Snyder–Phillips houses the Residential College in Arts & Humanities.

Academic offices
| Preceded by Lewis G. Gorton | President of Michigan Agricultural College; 1896–1915 | Succeeded by Frank S. Kedzie |
