= Kevin Guskiewicz =

American sports medicine scholar (born 1966)

- Guskiewicz in 2024

22nd President of Michigan State University
- Incumbent
- Assumed office March 4, 2024
- Preceded by: Teresa Woodruff (acting)

Chancellor of the University of North Carolina at Chapel Hill
- In office December 13, 2019 – January 11, 2024
- Preceded by: Carol Folt
- Succeeded by: Lee Harriss Roberts
- Acting
- In office February 6, 2019 – December 13, 2019
- Preceded by: Carol Folt
- Succeeded by: Lee Harriss Roberts

Personal details
- Born: April 8, 1966 (age 60) Latrobe, Pennsylvania, U.S.
- Education: West Chester University (BS); University of Pittsburgh (MS); University of Virginia (PhD)
- Awards: MacArthur Fellow (2011)
- Scientific career
- Fields: Neuroscience
- Workplaces: University of Virginia; University of North Carolina at Chapel Hill; Michigan State University
- Thesis: Effect of mild head injury on postural stability (1995)
- Doctoral advisor: David Perrin

Kevin Michael Guskiewicz (/ɡʌs.kəˈwɪts/ GUS-kə-wits; born April 8, 1966) is an American sports medicine scholar who has been serving as the 22nd president of Michigan State University since March 2024. He previously served as the 12th chancellor of the University of North Carolina at Chapel Hill from December 2019 to January 2024.

== Early life and education ==
Guskiewicz was born and raised in Latrobe, Pennsylvania. He played football and tennis at Greater Latrobe High School, a public high school in Latrobe, Pennsylvania.

Guskiewicz received a Bachelor of Science degree with a major in athletic training from West Chester University in Pennsylvania in 1989. He then received a Master of Science degree in exercise physiology/athletic training from the University of Pittsburgh in 1992 and a Ph.D. degree in sports medicine from the University of Virginia in 1995.

== Career ==
Guskiewicz began his academic career at University of North Carolina at Chapel Hill in 1995. He rose to Distinguished Professor and chair of the Department of Exercise and Sport Science at the University of North Carolina, where he was also founding director of the Matthew Gfeller Sport-Related Traumatic Brain Injury Research Center and research director of the Center for the Study of Retired Athletes. He was a 2011 MacArthur Fellow, based on his research on sports-related concussions.

On January 1, 2016, Guskiewicz was appointed as the dean of the College of Arts and Sciences at the University of North Carolina at Chapel Hill.

On February 6, 2019, he was appointed as interim chancellor of UNC Chapel Hill. On December 13, 2019, he was officially appointed as the 12th chancellor of UNC Chapel Hill by the University of North Carolina Board of Governors.

On December 8, 2023, the Michigan State University Board of Trustees unanimously voted to appoint Guskiewicz as the 22nd president of the university, effective on March 4, 2024. On May 18, 2026, the board of trustees voted to raise Guskiewicz's annual base salary from US$1 million to US$2 million and increase his unvested employer award from US$200,000 to US$250,000 per year.

On May 27, 2026, Guskiewicz was named the 16th president of Clemson University in South Carolina, and his resignation from MSU was at a date to be determined. On July 6th, 2026, it was announced that Guskiewicz would remain at Michigan State University and was no longer slated to serve as the 16th president of Clemson University.

== Personal life ==
Guskiewicz and his wife Amy have four children.
