= James M. Birney =

American lawyer, newspaper publisher & politician

James Birney
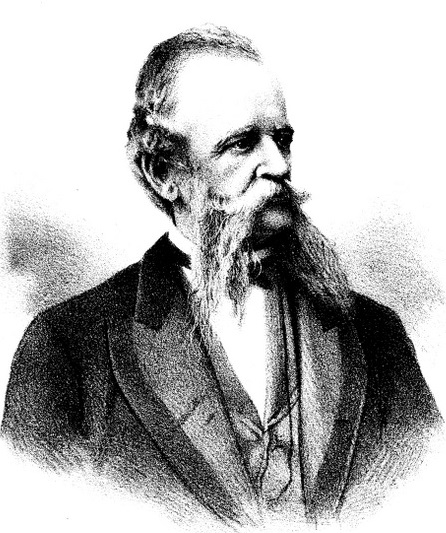

U.S. Minister to the Netherlands
- In office 1876–1882
- Preceded by: Charles T. Gorham
- Succeeded by: William Lewis Dayton, Jr.

13th Lieutenant Governor of Michigan
- In office January 2, 1861 – April 3, 1861
- Governor: Austin Blair
- Preceded by: Edmund Burke Fairfield
- Succeeded by: Joseph R. Williams

Member of the Michigan Senate from the 28th district
- In office 1859–1860
- Preceded by: Thomas Whitney
- Succeeded by: John N. Ingersoll

Personal details
- Born: June 17, 1817 Danville, Kentucky
- Died: May 8, 1888 (aged 70) Bay City, Michigan
- Resting place: Pine Ridge Cemetery, Bay City, Michigan
- Party: Republican
- Spouse: Amanda S. Moulton
- Children: 4
- Parent(s): James Gillespie Birney; Agatha (McDowell) Birney
- Education: Centre College; Miami University; Yale College
- Profession: Lawyer; Newspaper Publisher; Politician

James M. Birney (June 17, 1817 – May 8, 1888) was an American lawyer, newspaper publisher and politician from the U.S. state of Michigan. He served as the 13th lieutenant governor of Michigan and as the U.S. Minister to the Netherlands.

== Early life ==
James Birney was born in Danville, Kentucky, the eldest son of Agatha (McDowell) and James Gillespie Birney, who was a presidential candidate for the Liberty Party in the 1840 and 1844 elections. Birney spent his early years in Alabama and Kentucky. Birney was educated at Centre College in Danville and in 1836 graduated from Miami University in Oxford, Ohio. For the next two years, Birney was employed by the university as a professor of the Greek and Latin languages. After this, he studied law at Yale College in New Haven, Connecticut.

Completing his studies, Birney moved to Cincinnati, Ohio, and began the practice of law until 1856, when he succeeded to his father's business interests in the Saginaw Valley of Michigan, where his father had made large investments in what has become Bay City. Birney moved there in the summer of 1857. One of Birney's most notable early acts of public service was procuring the passage in 1857 of an act in the state legislature changing the name of "Lower Saginaw" to Bay City. In 1856, Birney had the distinction of editing the city's first newspaper, the Bay City Press, which lasted for only a few weeks.

== Political career ==
In 1858, Birney was nominated as a Republican candidate for the Michigan Senate. At the time the senate district was regarded as a stronghold of the Democratic Party, thus it was seen as a significant achievement that Birney garnered all of the votes in the district within Bay County except for five. He served a single term in the state senate representing the 28th district from 1859 to 1860. While in the Senate, Birney was chairman of the committee on public instruction and a member of the judiciary committee.

In 1860, Birney was nominated by the state Republican convention as the candidate for Lieutenant Governor with Austin Blair as candidate for Governor. Birney was elected to office by a majority of over 20,000 votes. While serving as Lieutenant Governor, a vacancy occurred in Michigan's 10th circuit court, and the governor offered the position to Birney. He resigned as Lieutenant Governor April 3, 1861, to accept the judicial appointment and served in that position for four years. Birney lost in the next judicial election and was succeeded by Jabez G. Sutherland.

Birney served as a delegate to the 1867 Michigan state constitutional convention, representing Bay County.

After leaving the bench, Birney established the Bay City Chronicle in 1871 as a weekly Republican paper and in June 1873 began publishing the Morning Chronicle. Birney was also a delegate to Republican National Convention from Michigan in 1872.

In 1872, Governor Henry P. Baldwin nominated Birney to U.S. President Ulysses S. Grant as Centennial Commissioner for Michigan to celebrate the Hundredth Anniversary of the Declaration of Independence in 1876. Birney was unable to serve in this capacity, however, as he was appointed on December 17, 1875, as U.S. Minister to the Netherlands. Birney departed for The Hague in 1876 and served until 1882.

Birney died on May 8, 1888, in Bay City, Michigan. He is interred in Pine Ridge Cemetery in Bay City.

== Personal life ==
While in New Haven studying at Yale College, Birney married Amanda Moulton on June 1, 1841. His wife was the stepdaughter of Nathaniel Bacon, Esquire of New Haven. Birney and his wife had five children: James G. Birney, Arthur Moulton Birney, Sophia Hull Birney, Alice Birney and one child that died in infancy. The eldest, James G. Birney, distinguished himself as captain in the 7th Regiment of Michigan Volunteers and died while an officer of the U.S. regular army.

Political offices
Preceded by Edmund B. Fairfield	Lieutenant Governor of Michigan; January 2 - April 3, 1861	Succeeded by Joseph R. Williams
Diplomatic posts
Preceded by Charles T. Gorham	U.S. Minister to the Netherlands; 1876–1882	Succeeded by William Lewis Dayton, Jr.
