= David Friday =

American academic administrator (1876–1945)

David Friday (1876–1945) president of the U.S. state of Michigan's Michigan Agricultural College (now Michigan State University) from 1922 to 1923.

Friday was a graduate of the University of Michigan and a member of Alpha Kappa Psi professional business fraternity.

During his presidency Michigan State created its first Ph.D. program.

Academic offices
Preceded by Frank S. Kedzie	President of Michigan Agricultural College; 1922–1923	Succeeded by Kenyon L. Butterfield
