= Gordon Guyer =

American academic administrator (1926–2016)

Gordon Earl Guyer (30 May 1926 – 30 March 2016) was president of Michigan State University from 1992 to 1993. He died on March 30, 2016, aged 89.

== Biography ==
Guyer attended Michigan State University (MSU) beginning in 1947 where he first studied fisheries and wildlife, later switching to entomology and receiving his bachelor's degree in 1950. Two years later, he earned his master's degree, and his doctorate in 1954, both in entomology. He joined the MSU faculty in 1953 and held many leadership roles on campus. Gordon was a professor and chairperson for the entomology department, the director of MSU's Pesticide Research Center - an institute he played a lead role in establishing - and the director of MSU Extension from 1973 to 1985. He was MSU vice president for Governmental Affairs and MSU President from 1992 to 1993. An esteemed researcher, he authored more than 70 papers on aquatic ecology, insect control technology, integrated pest control, public policy and international agriculture. His experience in entomology and Extension afforded him many opportunities away from campus, He served as consultant to the following groups: Michigan Vegetable Growers' Association, Michigan Farm Bureau, Agricultural Council, Michigan Departments of Health, Conservation, and Agriculture; Agriculture and Ways and Means Committees, Michigan Legislature; and the Michigan Governor's office. He also held Director positions at the Michigan Department of Agriculture, the Michigan Department of Natural Resources and the Kellogg Biological Station. Guyer traveled extensively for scientific research: he led one of the first American scientific groups allowed to visit China in the mid-1970s, and later traveled to Africa under United Nations' sponsorship to develop plant-protection education and research efforts in eight countries. He has served on boards of Neogen Corp., King Milling, and others.

Academic offices
Preceded by John A. DiBiaggio	President of Michigan State University; 1992–1993	Succeeded by M. Peter McPherson
Political offices
Preceded by Bill Schuette	Director of the Michigan Department of Agriculture; 1994-1996	Succeeded by Dan Wyant
