= Lewis R. Fiske =

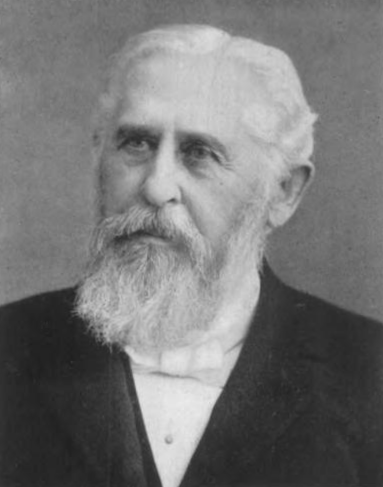

Lewis Ransom Fiske (December 24, 1825 – February 14, 1901) was an educator from the U.S. state of Michigan. He served as president pro tempore of the Agricultural College of the State of Michigan (now Michigan State University) from 1859 to 1862 and as president of Albion College from 1877 to 1898. Fiske sometimes spelled his name Fisk.

== Biography ==
Lewis Ransom Fiske was born in Penfield, New York, the sixth child of ten born to James and Eleanor (née Ransom) Fiske. The ancestors of the Fiske family left England to settle in Wenham, Massachusetts, in 1637. Lewis' father, James Fiske, was born in New Hampshire, August 4, 1788, and was a cousin to Levi Woodbury, a prominent politician from New Hampshire who served as a justice of the United States Supreme Court.

The family moved to a farm in Coldwater, Michigan, in 1835. In the school year 1845–46, Fiske attended the Wesleyan Seminary of Albion (now Albion College). He went on to graduate in 1850 with an A.B. from the University of Michigan. He began to study law, but in the fall of 1850 accepted a position as professor of Natural Science at the Albion Female Collegiate Institute and Wesleyan Seminary.

On September 19, 1852, Fiske married Elizabeth Ross Spence (d. February 25, 1879). Spence was the cousin of Scottish author and poet George MacDonald. In the summer of 1880 Fiske married Helen M. Davis of Detroit (d. 1896). Fiske had one daughter and one son with his first wife and three sons with the second.

In 1853, Fiske received an A.M. degree from the University of Michigan and also accepted a professorship at the Ypsilanti State Normal School (now Eastern Michigan University). In 1856, he became professor of Chemistry at the Agricultural College of the State of Michigan (now Michigan State University). He served as President pro tempore of the Agricultural College from 1859 to 1862 and also acted as the chaplain of the State Reform School in Lansing.

In 1863, Fiske entered the ministry for the Methodist Episcopal Church, served as pastor of the Methodist Episcopal in Jackson, 1863–66; of the Central Methodist Episcopal Church in Detroit, 1866–69; and of the First Methodist Church in Ann Arbor, 1869–72. In 1872 he was the Presiding Elder of the Ann Arbor District. In 1873, he was awarded the D.D. from Albion College and returned for another three years to his former pastorate in Detroit. From 1876 to 1877, he was in charge of the Tabernacle Methodist Episcopal Church in Detroit. For some time, beginning in January 1875, he was editor of the Michigan Christian Advocate, the organ of Michigan Methodism.

In 1877, Fiske became president of Albion College, in which position he remained for 22 years until his retirement in 1898. In 1878, he was honored with an LL.D. from the University of Michigan. He was elected six times as a delegate to the quadrennial general conference of the Methodist Episcopal Church, held respectively in Brooklyn, Baltimore, Philadelphia, New York City, Omaha, and Cleveland.

Fiske was president of the State Teachers Association of Michigan in 1889. He was appointed a member of the Ecumenical Council of the Methodist Episcopal Church the met in Washington D.C., in October 1891. For sixteen years he was a trustee of the board of education of the Methodist Episcopal Church. Fisk published several works, among them: "Echos from College Platform", "Among the Professions", "Today and Tomorrow", "Choosing a Life-work", and Man Building: A Treatise on Human Life and Its Forces (ISBN 1417953152).

Academic offices
Preceded by Joseph R. Williams	President of Agricultural College of the State of Michigan; 1859–1862	Succeeded by Theophilus C. Abbot
