= Lou Anna Simon =

American former university administrator

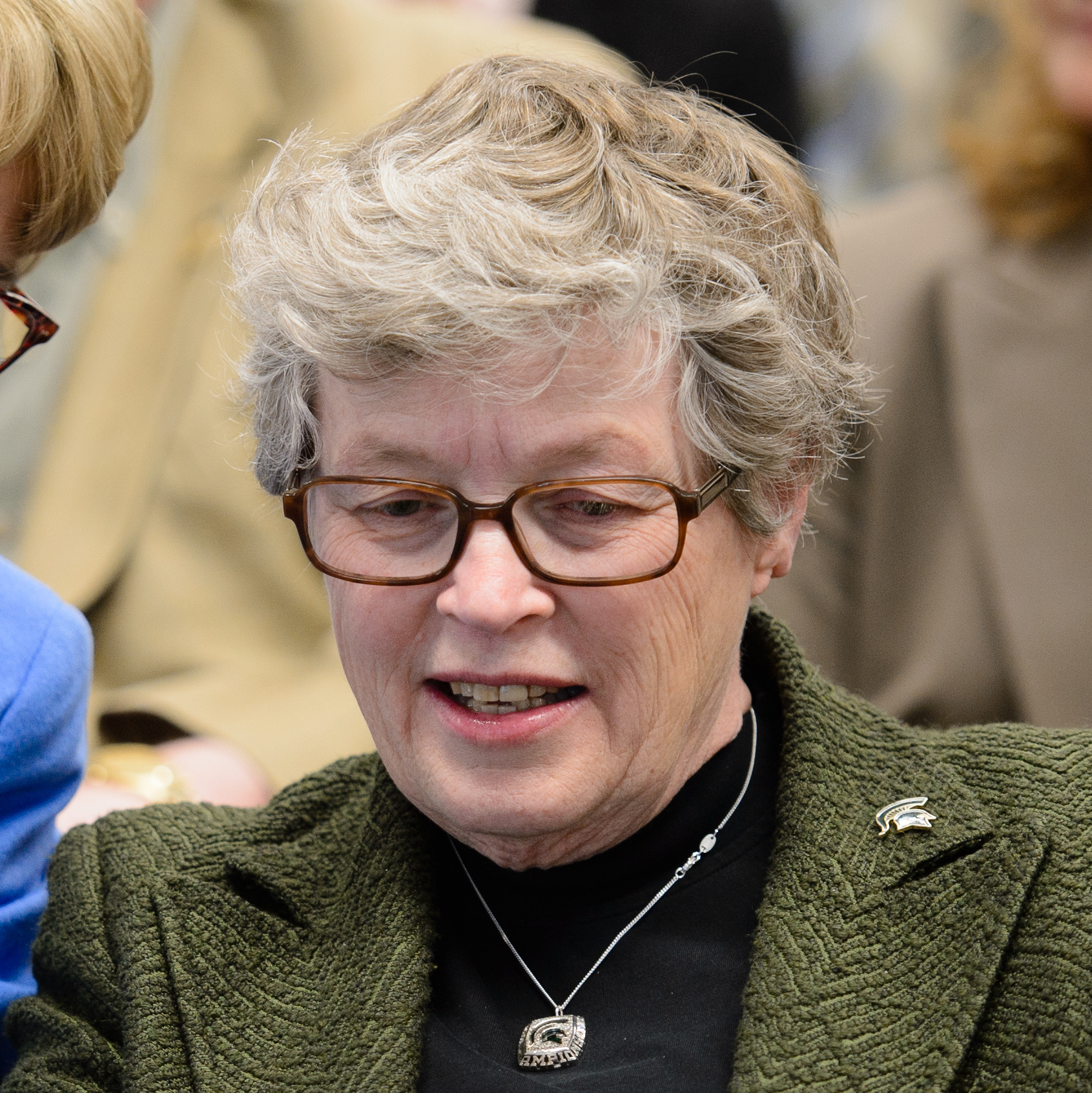
- Simon in 2014

20th President of Michigan State University
- In office January 1, 2005 – January 24, 2018
- Preceded by: M. Peter McPherson
- Succeeded by: John Engler (interim); Samuel L. Stanley
- In office April 25, 2003 – September 30, 2003

Personal details
- Education: Indiana State University (BA); Michigan State University (MS, PhD)

Lou Anna Kimsey Simon is an American academic administrator who served as the 20th president of Michigan State University (MSU) from 2005 until 2018.

Simon was named interim president of the university in 2003, then was appointed president in 2005. She served as chair of the executive committee of the National Collegiate Athletic Association from and as chair of the Board of Directors of the Federal Reserve Bank of Chicago Detroit Branch from 2013 to 2015. She was inducted into the Michigan Women's Hall of Fame in 2016. In December 2017, MSU appointed her John A. Hannah Distinguished Professor in the College of Education.

The following month, Simon resigned as university president amid claims that she had ignored reports of sexual abuse by Larry Nasser, an MSU sports physician. She retired from her teaching job at MSU in 2019.

== Education ==
Simon received her Bachelor of Arts in mathematics from Indiana State University in Terre Haute in 1969. She earned a Master of Science in student personnel and counseling from Indiana State University in 1970. In 1974, Simon earned a Ph.D in higher education from MSU. She is married and lives in East Lansing.

== Career ==
=== Michigan State University ===
Simon was hired by MSU as a faculty member in 1974. Over the years, she served in increasingly senior administrative positions: Assistant Director of the Office of Institutional Research, Assistant Provost for General Academic Administration, and Associate Provost. She served as Provost and Vice President for Academic Affairs from 1993 to 2004. From April 25 to September 30, 2003, she served as interim president while then-President M. Peter McPherson served as a representative of President George W. Bush in the reconstruction of Iraq.

On June 8, 2004, the MSU Board of Trustees voted unanimously to appoint Simon as president, effective January 1, 2005. She received a three-year contract with an annual salary of US$340,000.

In January 2006, the Board of Trustees increased Simon's salary to US$425,000 although President Simon and her husband Roy Simon donated that year's increase back to the university's capital campaign.

In 2006, Simon added MSU to the list of institutions opposing the passage of the Michigan Civil Rights Initiative, an initiative that ended affirmative action in the state of Michigan.

In August 2012, Simon began a two-year term as chair of the NCAA's executive committee. She was elected to the position one week after the committee levied sanctions on Penn State for its part in the Jerry Sandusky child sex abuse case. Simon said her goal was to "build trust and confidence back in the system."

Over her first decade in office, the New York Times wrote, Simon "developed a national profile" and "was renowned for her fund-raising abilities."

In December 2017, the MSU board of trustees quietly appointed Simon as the John A. Hannah Distinguished Professor in the School of Education, bypassing the customary academic procedure for prestigious professorships.

=== End of her MSU career ===
In early 2018, Michigan State's role in the Larry Nassar sexual abuse case led to criticism from students, faculty, state legislators, alumni and others, including calls for President Simon to step down. Nassar, a sports physician at MSU from 1997 to 2016, pleaded guilty in a Michigan court to seven charges of sexual assault and faces accusations of sexual assault from more than 150 young girls and women. The Detroit News reported that 14 MSU representatives, including Simon, had been told of sexual misconduct by Nassar across two decades. While the MSU trustees initially voiced support for Simon, public pressure continued to grow until January 24, 2018, when the Michigan House of Representatives approved a resolution calling on the Michigan State University Board of Trustees to fire Simon.

On January 24, 2018, Simon announced her resignation from the presidency, signing her resignation letter with her academic title, "John A. Hannah Distinguished Professor". Many faculty had been unaware of her appointment to the professorship; the revelation was met with criticism because Simon had spent most of her MSU career as an administrator, not a teacher or researcher, and because the trustees had bypassed usual academic procedure. Simon's contract allowed her to immediately take a 12-month research leave at her full presidential salary, after which she could officially assume her faculty position in the department of educational administration.

On November 20, 2018, Simon was charged by the state of Michigan with two felonies and two misdemeanor counts for lying to the police about her knowledge of sexual abuse committed by Nassar. MSU interim President John Engler announced that Simon would take an immediate leave of absence from the university, without pay.

Simon retired from MSU on August 29, 2019. Her retirement benefits included $2.45 million over three years, her vested retirement funding, and other benefits.

On May 13, 2020, Eaton County Circuit Court Judge John Maurer dismissed the charges against Simon, saying, "The prosecution did not provide evidence sufficient to give a reasonable person probable cause that Dr. Simon knew during her 2018 interview that her purported knowledge in 2014 of Dr. Nassar's name and the 'nature' and 'substance' of the complaint against him". Simon's attorney Lee Silver released a statement: "The Court’s ruling completely vindicates Dr. Simon and confirms what we have been saying from the day these charges were brought, namely, that there was not a shred of credible evidence to support these charges." Michigan Attorney General Dana Nessel appealed the ruling, but it was upheld unanimously by three judges who criticized Nessel's handling of the case; Judge Elizabeth Gleicher called Nessel's investigation a "sham".

Academic offices
| Preceded by David K. Scott | Provost of Michigan State University; 1993–2004 | Succeeded by Kim A. Wilcox |
| Preceded by M. Peter McPherson | Interim President of Michigan State University; 2003 | Succeeded by M. Peter McPherson |
| Preceded by M. Peter McPherson | President of Michigan State University; 2005–2018 | Succeeded by Bill Beekman (acting) |
