= Edwin Willits =

American politician

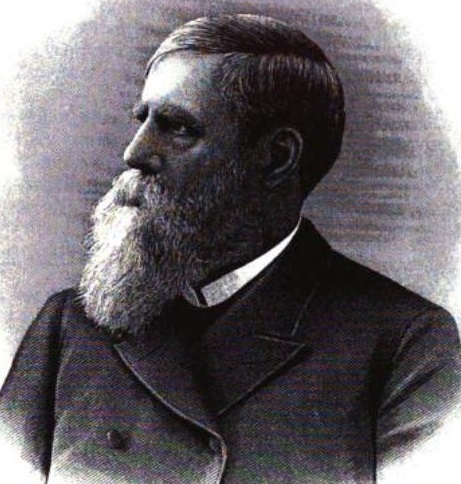
- From Volume 1 of 1890's History of Monroe County, Michigan

Member of the U.S. House of Representatives from Michigan's 2nd district
- In office March 4, 1877 – March 3, 1883
- Preceded by: Henry Waldron
- Succeeded by: Nathaniel B. Eldredge

Personal details
- Born: April 24, 1830 Otto, New York, U.S.
- Died: October 22, 1896 Washington, D.C., U.S.
- Party: Republican
- Spouse: Jane Ingersoll

Edwin Willits (also Willets) (April 24, 1830 – October 22, 1896) was a politician from the U.S. state of Michigan. Willits served as prosecuting attorney of Monroe County, Republican from Michigan's 2nd congressional district for the 45th, 46th, and 47th Congresses. Presidents of Michigan State Normal School (now Eastern Michigan University) and the State Agricultural College (now Michigan State University). The first Assistant U.S. Secretary of Agriculture under Jeremiah McLain Rusk for Benjamin Harrison's administration.

== Early life ==
Willits was born in Otto, New York and moved to Michigan with his parents in September 1836. He graduated from the University of Michigan at Ann Arbor in June 1855. The following April he settled in Monroe, Michigan where he was editor of the Monroe Commercial from 1856 to 1861. He studied law and was admitted to the bar in December 1857 and commenced practice in Monroe. He married Jane Ingersoll in 1856 and was a Presbyterian.

== Career ==
Willits served as prosecuting attorney of Monroe County from 1860 to 1862 and was a member of the State board of education from 1860 to 1872. He was appointed postmaster of Monroe on January 1, 1863, by President Abraham Lincoln, and removed by President Andrew Johnson on October 15, 1866. He was a member of the commission to revise the Michigan Constitution in 1873.

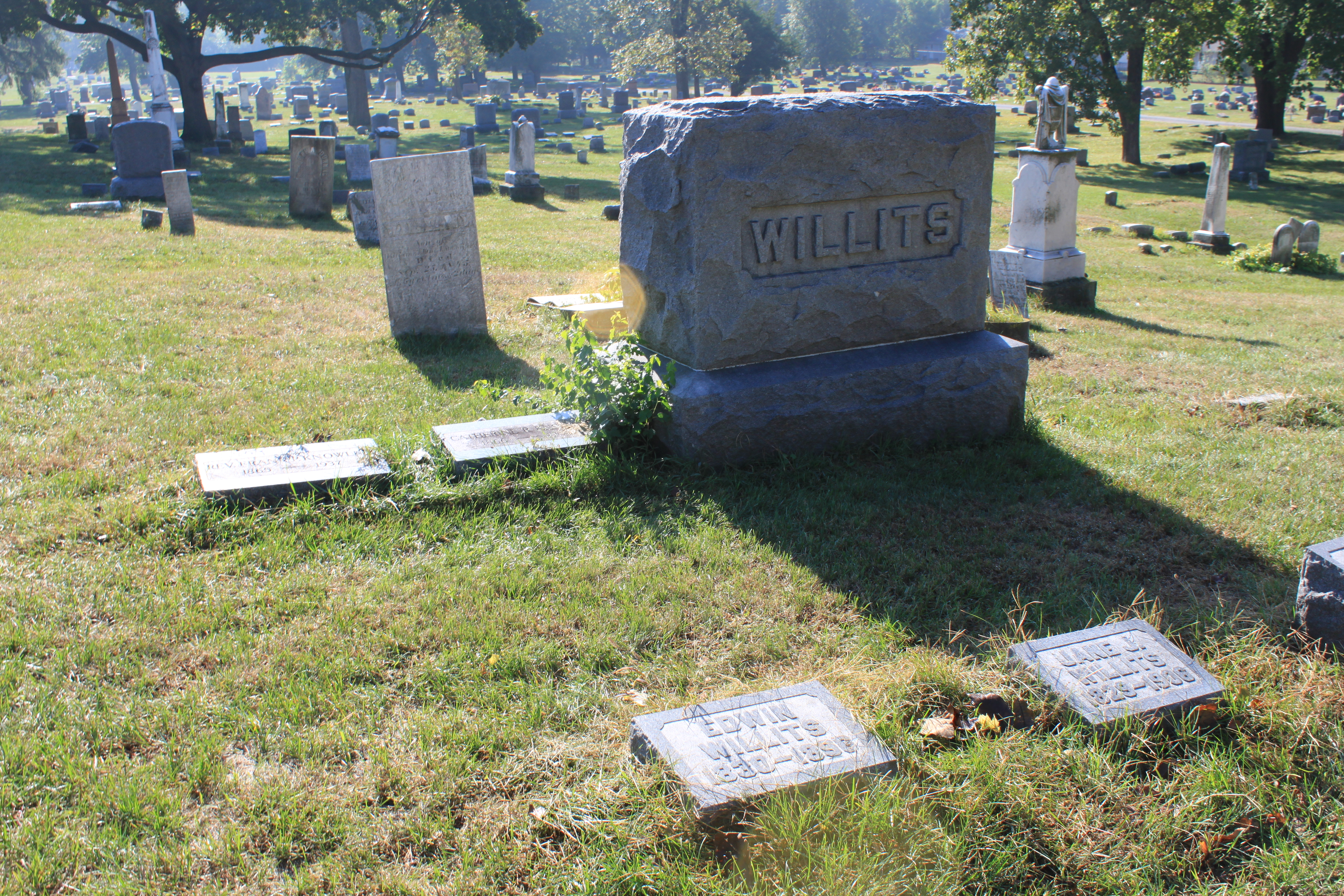
Willits grave

In 1876, Willits was elected as a Republican from Michigan's 2nd congressional district to the 45th United States Congress and subsequently re-elected to the 46th, and 47th Congresses, serving from March 4, 1877 to March 3, 1883. During the Forty-seventh Congress he was chairman of the Committee on Expenditures in the Department of Justice. He was not a candidate for renomination in 1882.

Willits was principal of the Michigan State Normal School at Ypsilanti from 1883 to 1885. He served as president of the State Agricultural College from 1885 to 1889 where he inaugurated the school's mechanical engineering program and secured state funding for its initial building. In Benjamin Harrison's administration, he served as the first Assistant U.S. Secretary of Agriculture under Jeremiah McLain Rusk from March 23, 1889 to December 31, 1893. In 1890 he established the policy that all research by the Department would be mission-oriented to a practical objective, and encouraged USDA employees to look beyond the seed and plant distribution program which had previously been the main activity of the Department. This reorientation led to the creation of additional divisions within the USDA during the 1890s.

Willits continued the practice of law in Washington, D.C., until his death there. He was interred in Woodland Cemetery in Monroe, Michigan.

U.S. House of Representatives
Preceded by Henry Waldron	United States Representative for the 2nd congressional district of Michigan; 1877–1883	Succeeded by Nathaniel B. Eldredge
Academic offices
Preceded by Theophilus C. Abbot	President of Michigan Agricultural College; 1885–1889	Succeeded by Oscar Clute
