= Lewis G. Gorton =

Lewis G. Gorton (November 18, 1859 – January 3, 1933) was president of the U.S. state of Michigan's State Agricultural College (now Michigan State University) from 1893 to 1895.

Academic offices
Preceded by Oscar Clute	President of Michigan Agricultural College; 1893–1895	Succeeded by Jonathan L. Snyder
