= Oscar Clute =

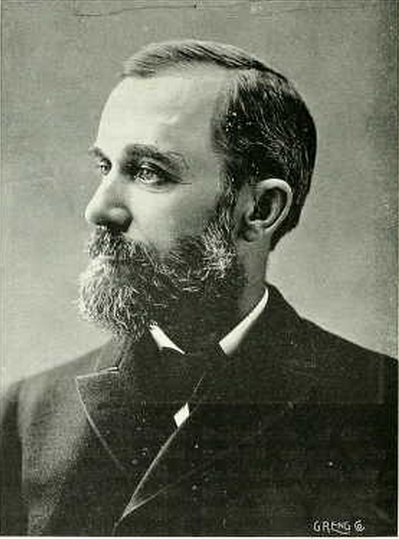
Clute from 1896 M. A. C. yearbook

Oscar Clute (1837–1902) was president of the U.S. state of Michigan's State Agricultural College (now Michigan State University) from 1889 to 1893.

== Early years ==
Oscar Clute was born in Albany, New York.

== Career ==
=== 1855–1859 ===
From 1855 to 1859 Clute taught high school.

=== 1862 ===
In 1862, Clute graduated from the State Agricultural College where he eventually taught math for four years.

=== 1864 ===
Clute received his M.S. degree.

=== 1889 ===
Clute was selected to be the president of the State Agricultural College and remained so for four years.

=== 1893 ===
Became president of Florida Agricultural College, which is now the University of Florida.

=== 1897 ===
Clute and his family moved to Pomona, California, where he went back to ministry.

== Family ==
In 1864 Oscar married Mary Merrylees, who was the sister of Mrs. T.C. Abbot. Together the two had six children: William Merrylees, Oscar Clark, Lucy Merrylees, Katherine Spencer, Edward Hale and Marie Morrill.

== Death ==
He died near Los Angeles, California, on January 27, 1902.

Academic offices
Preceded by Edwin Willits	President of Michigan Agricultural College; 1889–1893	Succeeded by Lewis G. Gorton
