= Frank S. Kedzie =

Frank Stewart Kedzie (May 12, 1857 – January 5, 1935) was president of the U.S. state of Michigan's Michigan Agricultural College (now Michigan State University) from 1915 to 1921. Kedzie Hall, located on campus on the north side of the Red Cedar River was named in honor of his father, Robert C. Kedzie, who was a Professor of Chemistry at Michigan Agricultural College from 1863 to 1902.

Academic offices
Preceded by Jonathan L. Snyder	President of Michigan Agricultural College; 1915–1921	Succeeded by David Friday
