= Theophilus C. Abbot =

American educator and college president

Theophilus Capen Abbot

3rd President of the State Agricultural College, now Michigan State University
- In office 1862–1885
- Preceded by: Lewis R. Fiske
- Succeeded by: Edwin Willits

Personal details
- Born: April 29, 1826 Vassalboro, Maine, U.S.
- Died: November 7, 1892 (aged 66)
- Spouse: Sarah Merrylees
- Children: Mary Mouat and Joseph Rodney
- Education: Colby College (BA, AM)

Theophilus Capen Abbot (April 29, 1826 – November 7, 1892) was an American educator and the third President of the State Agricultural College (now Michigan State University), serving from 1863 until 1885.

== Early life ==
He was born in Vassalboro, Maine, and spent his early life in Augusta, Maine. At the age of fifteen he entered Colby University (now Colby College) in Waterville, Maine. He graduated in 1845 with his bachelor's degree, and received his A.M. degree from Colby four years later.

== Career ==
After receiving his master's degree, Abbot taught in Vermont, at Bangor Theological Seminary and Colby University in Maine, and in Berrien Springs, Michigan. In 1857, he became the first principal of the Union School (later Ann Arbor High School), the first secondary school to serve the entire city of Ann Arbor, Michigan.

In 1858, Abbot accepted the Professorship of English literature at the newly formed State Agricultural College (later Michigan Agricultural College and now Michigan State University) in East Lansing, Michigan. He also served as the treasurer of the college in 1860, and as secretary pro tempore of the State Board of Agriculture in 1861 and 1862. In December 1862, he was unanimously selected as the third president of the college, a position he held for 22 years (1862–1885) while still continuing to teach. Ill health forced him to step down as president in 1885, and then later from his professorship in 1889. In 1890, he received an honorary LL.D. degree in 1890 from the University of Michigan. His health continued to deteriorate after his retirement and he died on November 7, 1892.

== Personal life ==
On July 5, 1860, Abbot married Sarah Merrylees, a teacher at the Union School in Ann Arbor, and they had two children: Mary Mouat (b. January 10, 1863; d. March 20, 1903) and Joseph Rodney (b. March 30, 1865).

== Legacy ==
- Abbot Hall (attached to Mason Hall) in Michigan State University's North Neighborhood.
- Abbot Road in East Lansing, Michigan.
- Abbot Elementary School, of Ann Arbor Public Schools.

Academic offices
Preceded by Lewis R. Fiske	President of Michigan Agricultural College; 1862–1885	Succeeded by Edwin Willits
