= Residential College in Arts and Humanities =

Residential college at Michigan State University

Michigan State University Residential College in the Arts and Humanities
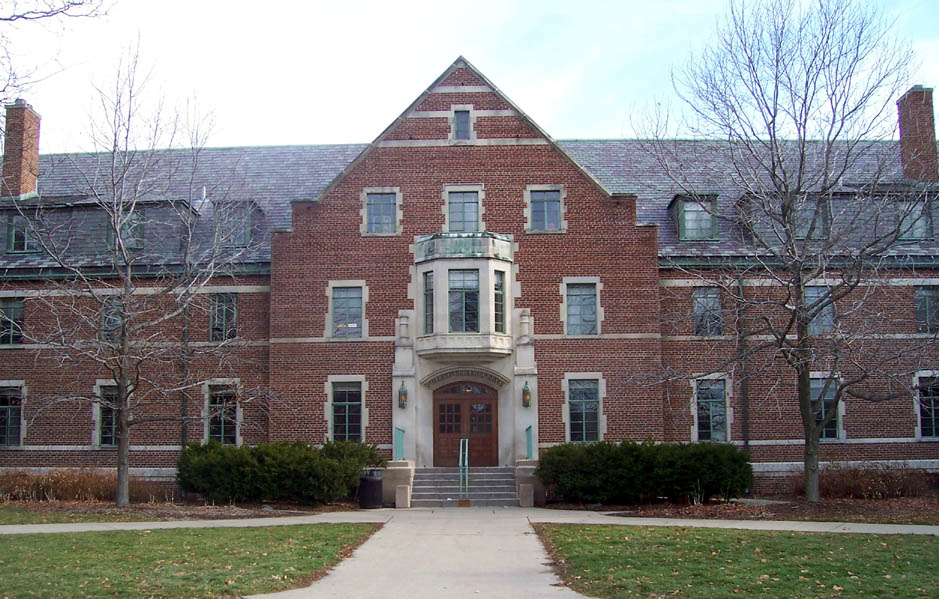
- Snyder-Phillips Hall houses RCAH.
- Type: Public
- Established: 2005
- Interim Dean: Glenn Chambers
- Students: 600
- Location: East Lansing, Michigan, USA
- Campus: Suburban
- Website: http://rcah.msu.edu/
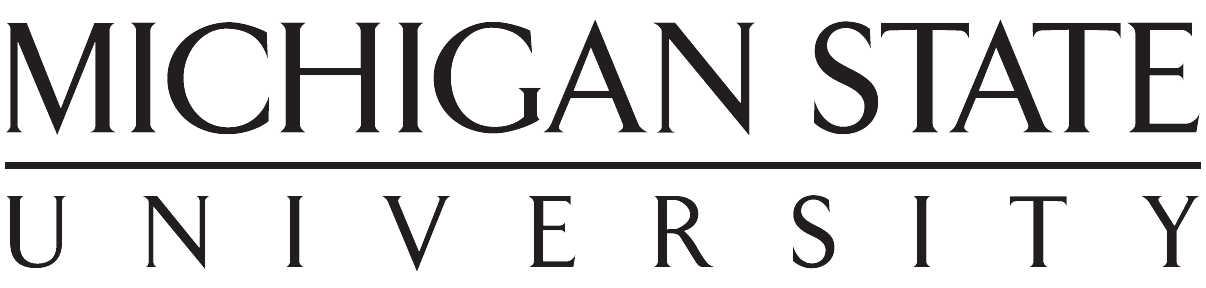

The Residential College in the Arts and Humanities (RCAH) is a residential college at Michigan State University (MSU) in East Lansing, Michigan, United States. Founded on October 21, 2005, the college provides around 600 undergraduates (150 students per undergraduate class) with an individualized curriculum in the liberal, visual, and performing arts. Though all the students in the program will graduate with the same degree, only the first year programs and MSU prerequisites are mandatory for graduation. The college encourages its students to get a second degree or specialization in a program outside RCAH. The new college is MSU's fourth residential college, after James Madison College (from which it drew several faculty members, including Stephen L. Esquith), the Lyman Briggs School, and the now-defunct Justin Morrill College. Although early proposals named the college after Nelson Mandela, university officials had not decided on a permanent name as of 2006, saying that it was still too early to fix a permanent name to the college.

== Snyder-Phillips renovation ==
RCAH classes started in autumn 2007 in the Collegiate Gothic Snyder-Phillips Residence Hall. Built in 1947, Snyder-Phillips once housed Justin Morrill College. MSU renovated the dormitory to make room for the new college. Along with a new dining hall and upgraded bathrooms, the expanded Snyder-Phillips includes a 150-seat multipurpose classroom and performing arts space, a student art gallery, a Wi-Fi-enabled coffeeshop, music practice rooms, and a language-learning center.
