= Erica (given name) =

Erica is a feminine given name, variant of Erika. Notable people with the name include:

- Erica Adams (born 1969), American former tennis player
- Erica Alfridi (born 1968), Italian race walker
- Erica Anderson (1914–1976), American film director, writer and cinematographer
- Erica Anderson (psychologist) (born 1951), American psychologist
- Erica Andrews (1969–2013), Mexican performer and actress
- Erica Armstrong Dunbar, American historian
- Erica Ash (1977–2024), American actress and comedian
- Erica Azim, Zimbabwean musician
- Erica Baker (born 1980), American engineer
- Erica Baker (American girl) (1989–1999), missing American girl
- Erica Baneth (born 1928), Australian sculptor
- Erica Banks (born 1998), American rapper
- Erica Barbieri (born 1981), Italian judo practitioner
- Erica Barks-Ruggles (born 1967), American diplomat
- Erica C. Barnett (born 1977), American journalist
- Erica Bartolina (born 1980), American pole vaulter
- Erica Basnicki (born 1980), Canadian writer
- Erica Batchelor (born 1933), British figure skater
- Erica Baum (born 1961), American photographer
- Erica Beer (1925–2013), German film actress
- Erica Benner (born 1962), British philosopher
- Erica Bougard (born 1993), American Olympic athlete
- Erica Brausen (1908–1992), German art dealer and gallerist
- Erica Brittain, American biostatistician
- Erica Brown (born 1966), Jewish-American writer
- Erica Buettner (born 1984), American singer-songwriter
- Erica Buratto (born 1984), Italian swimmer
- Erica Burman (born 1960), British psychologist
- Erica Campbell (born 1972), American singer-songwriter
- Erica Carlson, American physicist
- Erica Carney (born 1985), American cyclist
- Erica Lee Carter (born 1980), American politician
- Erica Cerra (born 1979), Canadian actress
- Erica Chenoweth (born 1980), American political scientist and professor
- Erica Chissapa (born 1987), Angolan actress and journalist
- Erica Cho, American animator and filmmaker
- Erica Cipressa (born 1996), Italian fencer
- Erica Clevenger (born 1994), American cyclist
- Erica-Cody (born 1996), Irish singer-songwriter
- Erica Coppey (born 1991), Belgian field hockey player
- Erica Cornejo, Argentine ballet dancer
- Erica Crawley (born 1980), American politician
- Erica Cruikshank Dodd (born 1928), Canadian art historian
- Erica Cunningham (born 1993), American footballer
- Erica Curtis (born 1991), Canadian curler
- Erica-Irene Daes (1925–2017), Greek diplomat
- Erica Dambach (born 1975), American college soccer coach
- Erica Dasher (born 1986), American actress
- Erica Dawson, people
- Erica De Mane (born 1953), American chef
- Erica De Matteis (born 1994), Italian model
- Erica de Vries, American politician
- Erica Deeman (born 1977), British visual artist
- Erica Deichmann Gregg, (1913–2007), Canadian potter
- Erica Dittmer (born 1991), Mexican-American breakstroke swimmer
- Erica Dunton, British director and screenwriter
- Erica Durance (born 1978), Canadian actress
- Erica Ehm (born 1961), Canadian writer and actress
- Erica Eloff, French soprano
- Erica Enders (born 1983), American racing driver
- Erica Eng (born 1998), Malaysian comic book artist and animator
- Erica Ericsson (born 1990), Swedish football player
- Erica Eyres (born 1980), Canadian artist
- Erica Ferencik (born 1958), American novelist and screenwriter
- Erica Fernandes (born 1993), Indian actress and former model
- Erica Field (born 1974), American economist
- Erica Fischer (born 1943), Austrian writer and translator
- Erica Flapan (born 1956), American mathematician
- Erica Fontes (born 1991), Portuguese pornographic actress
- Erica Fowler (born 1992), Australian rules footballer
- Erica Frank (born 1962), American educator and inventor
- Erica Funkhouser (born 1949), American poet
- Erica Garner (1990–2017), American activist
- Erica Gavel (born 1991), Canadian basketball player
- Erica Gavin (born 1947), American film actress
- Erica Geisen, German bodybuilder
- Erica Gimpel (born 1964), American actress
- Erica Glasper, American neuroscientist
- Erica Glynn (born 1964), American actress
- Erica Golemis, American oncologist
- Erica Green, people
- Erica Groshen (born 1954), American economist
- Erica Grow (born 1980), American meteorologist
- Erica Halloway (born 1984), Australian association football player
- Erica Harriss, American politician
- Erica Hawley (born 1998), Bermudian triathlete
- Erica Henderson, American comic artist
- Erica Hill (born 1976), American journalist
- Erica Hinckson, New Zealand academic
- Erica Hooker (born 1953), Australian long jumper
- Erica Howe (born 1992), Canadian ice hockey player
- Erica Hubbard (born 1979), American actress and model
- Erica Hunt (born 1955), American poet and essayist
- Erica iJi, British singer-songwriter
- Erica James (born 1960), British writer
- Erica Jarder (born 1986), Swedish long jumper
- Erica Jarrell (born 1999), American rugby union player
- Erica Jen (1952–2023), American mathematician
- Erica Jesseman (born 1989), American marathon runner
- Erica Johansson (born 1974), Swedish former long jumper
- Erica Johnson (born 1964), Canadian broadcaster
- Erica Johnson Debeljak (born 1961), American writer and translator
- Erica Jong (born 1942), American novelist
- Erica Kennedy (1970–2012), American author and blogger
- Erica Kershaw (born 1991), Australian cricketer
- Erica Klarreich (born 1972), American mathematician
- Erica Kochi (born 1979), Japanese humanitarian aid worker
- Erica Krauth (born 1981), Argentine retired tennis player
- Erica Kuligowski, American social scientist and researcher
- Erica Larson (born 1971), American long-distance runner
- Erica Layon, American politician
- Erica Lee (1888–1981), British artist and sculptor
- Erica Leerhsen (born 1976), American actress
- Erica Lehrer (born 1969), American anthropologist and curator
- Erica Lennard (born 1950), American photographer
- Erica Lindbeck (born 1992), American voice actress
- Erica Lindsay (born 1955), American saxophone player and composer
- Erica Lippitz, American hazzan
- Erica Lord (born 1978), Alaska Native artist
- Erica Luttrell (born 1982), Canadian actress
- Erica MacDonald (born 1967), American lawyer
- Erica Magnaldi (born 1992), Italian cyclist
- Erica Malunguinho (born 1981), Brazilian politician
- Erica Mann (1917–2007), Kenyan architect and town planner
- Erica Martrece Wilson (born 1991), American volleyball player
- Erica Meier, American animal rights advocate
- Erica Mena (born 1987), American TV personality and actress
- Erica Mendez (born 1988), American voice actress
- Erica Messer (born 1974), American television writer
- Erica Mindel, American-Israeli soldier
- Erica Mitchell (born 1987), American ice hockey player
- Erica Moodie, Canadian biostatistician
- Erica Moore (born 1988), American middle-distance runner
- Erica Moore (politician) (born 1965), American politician
- Erica Morningstar (born 1989), Canadian swimmer
- Erica Mosca (born 1986), American politician and teacher
- Erica Mou (born 1990), Italian singer and musician
- Erica Muhl (born 1961), American composer and conductor
- Erica Nego (born 1984), Ghanaian-American beauty pageant contestant
- Erica Nockalls (born 1983), English violinist and vocalist
- Erica Ogwumike (born 1997), Nigerian-American basketball player
- Erica Ollmann Saphire, American structural biologist and immunologist
- Erica Oomen, Dutch cyclist
- Erica Oyama (born 1981), American television writer and film producer
- Erica Packer (born 1977), Australian former singer
- Erica Page, American actress and model
- Erica Pappritz (1893–1972), German diplomat
- Erica Parsons (1998–2011), American child murderer
- Erica Payne (born 1969), American commentator and author
- Erica Peck (born 1986), Canadian actress and singer
- Erica Pedretti (1930–2022), Swiss author
- Erica Peeples (born 1984), American actress
- Erica Pienaar (born 1952), South African schoolteacher
- Erica Plambeck, American operations researcher
- Erica Powell (1921–2007), British secretary
- Erica Pratt (born 1995), American abduction survivor
- Erica Procunier, Canadian film composer
- Erica Prugger (born 1945), Italian luger
- Erica Reiner (1924–2005), American assyriologist and author
- Erica Rendler (born 1980), American cricketer
- Erica Rhodes (born 1983), American actress and comedian
- Erica Rieder (born 1996), Canadian ice hockey player
- Erica Rivera (born 1988), American actress
- Erica Rivinoja, American writer and film producer
- Erica Robin (born 1998), Pakistani model
- Erica Roe (born 1957), English sweet potato and flower farmer
- Erica Rose, people
- Erica Bree Rosenblum, American herpetologist and evolutionary biologist
- Erica Rossi (born 1955), Italian former sprinter
- Erica Roth, American politician
- Erica Russell (born 1951), New Zealand film animator
- Erica Rutherford (1923–2008), British-Canadian artist and filmmaker
- Erica Sabiti (died 1988), Ugandan archbishop
- Erica Sakurazawa (born 1963), Japanese manga artist
- Erica Sanders (born 1997), English field hockey player
- Erica Scarff (born 1996), Canadian paracanoeist
- Erica Schmidt (born 1975), American theatre director and playwright
- Erica Schroeder (born 1975), American voice actress
- Erica Schultz (born 1977), American comic book writer
- Erica Schwartz, American health official
- Erica Schwartz (politician) (born 1978), American politician
- Erica Scourti, Greek artist
- Erica Shaffer (born 1970), American actress
- Erica Sigurdson (born 1974), Canadian comedian and writer
- Erica Simone Turnipseed (born 1971), American novelist
- Erica Sjöström (born 1970), Swedish singer and saxophonist
- Erica Skinger (born 1949), American alpine ski racer
- Erica Skroski (born 1994), American retired soccer player
- Erica D. Smith (born 1969), American engineer and politician
- Erica Smyth (born 1952), Australian geologist
- Erica Sorgi (born 1982), American springboard diver
- Erica Spatz, American cardiologist and researcher
- Erica Spindler (born 1957), American novelist
- Erica Stanford (born 1978), New Zealand politician
- Erica Stokes, American former gymnast
- Erica Sullivan (swimmer) (born 2000), retired American swimmer
- Erica Sugo Anyadike, Tanzanian writer
- Erica Sweany, American actress and dancer
- Erica Taylor (born 1933), former Australian equestrian
- Erica Tazel (born 1977), American theatre actress
- Erica Terpstra (born 1943), Dutch swimmer and former politician
- Erica Terwillegar (born 1963), American luger
- Erica Thomas (born 1987), American politician and youth leader
- Erica Tietze-Conrat (1883–1958), Austrian-American art historian
- Erica Tonooka (born 1991), Japanese actress
- Erica Tremblay (born 1980), American filmmaker
- Erica Udén Johansson (born 1989), Swedish retired ice hockey player
- Erica Underwood (1907–1992), Australian expert in psychology
- Erica Vaal (1927–2013), Austrian actress and writer
- Erica van Dijck (born 1966), Dutch badminton player
- Erica van Zon (born 1979), New Zealand artist
- Erica Vexler (died 2011), Chilean journalist and editor
- Erica von Kleist (born 1982), American flautist and saxophonist
- Erica Wagner (born 1967), American author and critic
- Erica Wagner (artist) (born 1967), Australian artist and editor
- Erica N. Walker (born 1971), American mathematician
- Erica Wallach (1923–1993), German teacher
- Erica Watson (1973–2021), American actress and comedian
- Erica Wheeler (born 1991), American basketball player
- Erica White (born 1986), American basketball player
- Erica White (artist) (1904–1991), British sculptor
- Erica Whyman (born 1969), English theatre director
- Erica Wiebe (born 1989), Canadian retired professional wrestler
- Erica Willis (1934–2025), Australian long jumper
- Erica Wilson (1928–2011), American designer
- Erica Woodland, American social worker
- Erica Wu (born 1996), American table tennis player
- Erica Yohn (1928–2019), American television actress
- Erica Yuen (born 1980), Hong Kong politician and actress
- Erica Zaveta (born 1989), American cyclist

== Fictional characters ==
- Erica Farrell, a character in the media franchise Degrassi
- Erica Fontaine, a character in the media franchise Sakura Taisen
- Erica Hahn, a character in the television series Grey's Anatomy
- Erica Hartmann, a character in the media franchise Strike Witches
- Erica Kane, a character in the soap opera All My Children
- Erica Reyes, a character in the television series Teen Wolf
- Erica Strange, a character in the television series Being Erica
- Erica Sinclair, a character in the Netflix Series Stranger Things
- Erica Yurken, protagonist of the novel Hating Alison Ashley

== See also ==
- Erica (disambiguation)
- Ericka
- Erika (given name)
