= Erika =

Erika may refer to:

== Arts and entertainment ==
- Hayasaka Erika (Megatokyo)
- Erika (Friends)
- Erika (Pokémon)
- Erika (Underworld)
- Erika Itsumi (Girls und Panzer)
- Erika (film), a 1971 Italian thriller film
- Erika (song), a German marching song

== People ==
- Erika (given name), a female given name (including a list of persons and fictional characters with the name)
- Érika (Brazilian footballer), Brazilian footballer

== Other ==
- ERIKA Enterprise (software), an open source OSEK/VDX embedded operating system
- Erika (law), maritime laws, legislative packages of the European Union
- Erika (moth), a genus of moth
- MV Erika (ship), an oil tanker which sank off the coast of France in 1999
- Any of several tropical storms named Erika
- Erika typewriter

== See also ==
- Erica (disambiguation)
