= West Cork oil spill =

Coordinates: 51.354130°N 8.285561°W

Point at which spill was initially detected by EMSA

The West Cork oil spill was an oil spill off the southern coast of Ireland. The spill was first identified by the European Maritime Safety Agency's CleanSeaNet satellite monitoring system on 14 February 2009. An Irish Air Corps marine patrol aircraft confirmed the slick's presence near the Admiral Kuznetsov which was undergoing refuelling around the same time. The British Coastguard and Irish Department of Transport agreed that around 300 tonnes of oil were spilled. The Russian Navy accepted responsibility for the incident but disputed the quantity, claiming around 20-30 tonnes had been spilt either whilst washing the decks or pumping out the bilges of the carrier, the Russian Navy made no notification to any authority at the time of the spill. The oil spill drifted eastwards and there were fears that the spill would wash up on the coast of south eastern Ireland or Wales but it broke up before this.

== Discovery ==
On 14 February 2009, the Irish Coast Guard received a European Maritime Safety Agency (EMSA) surveillance report indicating the presence of water pollution off the south coast of Ireland. EMSA's CleanSeaNet system made the initial detection and reported up to four separate slicks. The Coast Guard dispatched an Irish Air Corps CASA CN-235 maritime patrol aircraft to investigate which confirmed the presence of oil on the surface of the sea around a Russian Navy oil tanker and the Admiral Kuznetsov aircraft carrier. The spill was located in international waters 80 km (50 mi) south of Fastnet Rock, Ireland's most southwesterly point, and spread over an area measuring 6.4 by 8 km (4.0 by 5.0 mi).

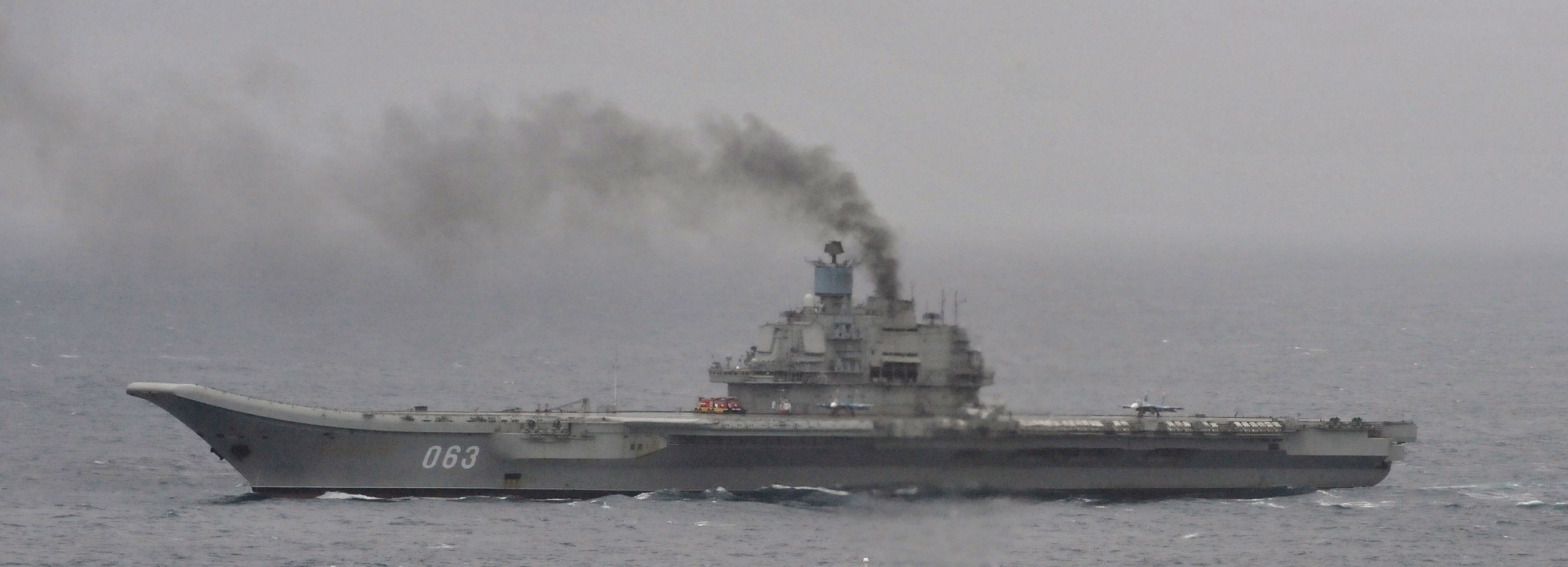
The Admiral Kuznetsov which caused the spill (2012 photograph)

On 16 February, the Russian naval attaché in Ireland confirmed that the carrier had been carrying out replenishment of fuel at sea from a Russian supply tanker. The attaché confirmed an internal investigation was being carried out into the cause of the incident and said that Russian aerial surveillance considered that approximately 300 tonnes of oil was on the sea surface but could not tell how this happened or whether it was from their refuelling operations. The Russian Navy offered no explanation for the presence of the oil but began an internal investigation into the matter. Admiral Korolev, the commander of the Russian ships stated that the refuelling proceeded in a routine manner and that there had been no leaks. The Russian Navy stated that it was willing to share data in an attempt to identify the origin of the spill. The Admiral Kuznetsov is normally accompanied by at least one ocean-going tug in case of breakdown, on this occasion she was also accompanied by the Admiral Chabanenko. The carrier was en route to its home port following exercises in the Mediterranean Sea where, on 6 January, it suffered a fire which resulted in the death of one sailor.

The British Coastguard initially estimated the quantity of oil spilled at around 1,000 tonnes, later revised down to 522 and then to 300 tonnes, a figure with which the Irish Department of Transport agreed with. If the original 1,000 tonnes estimate had proven accurate then this oil spill would have been the biggest to have affected Great Britain and Ireland since the Sea Empress ran aground near Milford Haven in 1996.

== Slick movement ==
Late on 17 February 2009, the spill was confirmed to have broken into three streams moving eastwards along Ireland's south coast, at a distance of around 48–64 km (30–40 mi) offshore. On 18 February changing wind patterns and unexpected mild weather had pushed the oil slick, which had not moved significantly since the evening before, further from shore. The Irish Coast Guard ran computer simulations of the spill and expected some oil to dissolve or evaporate. Depending on weather conditions, the spill could have washed up onto the Irish south-east coast in late February and may have hit Wales shortly thereafter. On 20 February, however, the spill was reported to be moving very slowly eastwards and the Irish Coast Guard said that it was possible that the slick may avoid the Irish coast completely, owing to favourable winds. By 23 February the spill was moving at just five nautical miles per day and was 50 kilometres (31 mi) south of Cork harbour and continuing to disperse. By 25 February the slick was expected to move further away from the Irish coastline whilst continuing to disperse and break up and on 27 February the Irish Coast Guard confirmed it now expected the spill to disperse before making landfall unless there was a significant change to the expected weather. EMSA continued to monitor the spill until its complete dispersal on 8 March.

=== Environmental impact ===
The spill threatened birds, dolphins, porpoises and seals native to Ireland's south coast. The Irish Farmers' Association (IFA) Aquaculture division called on the relevant local authorities and the Environmental Protection Agency to ensure that shellfish farmers in counties Cork, Wexford and Waterford were protected, as the area accounted for over 25% of Ireland's mussels and oyster production. The Bord Iascaigh Mhara (Irish Fisheries Board) tested wild and farmed shellfish on the southern coast as a precautionary measure. Both the Irish and Russian authorities stated that the spill had not affected fishing areas or coastal habitats.

== Responses ==
=== British and Irish national response ===
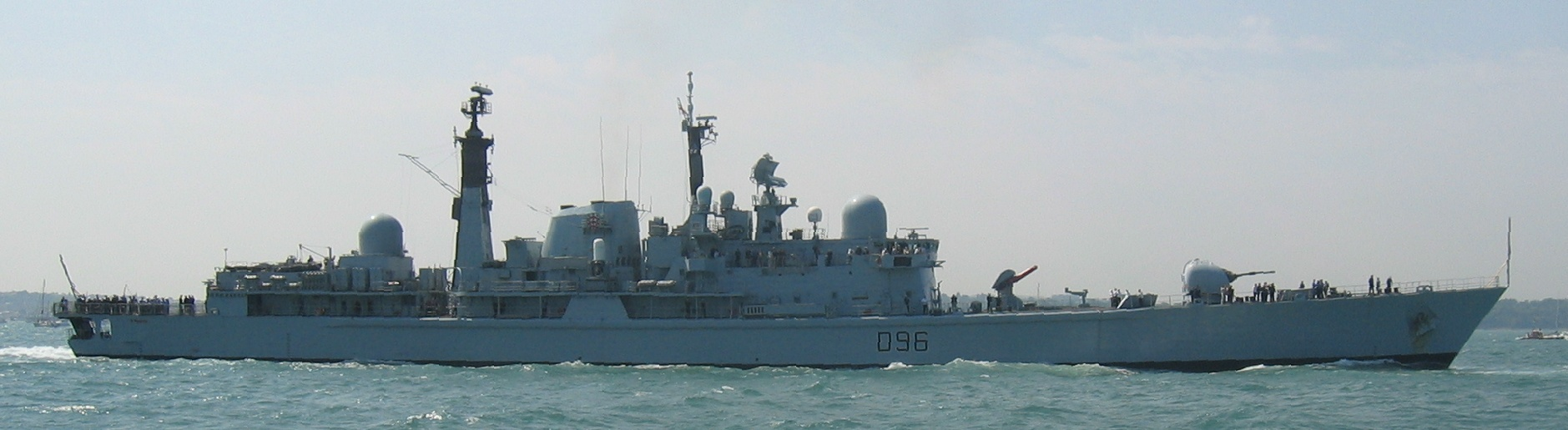
HMS Gloucester

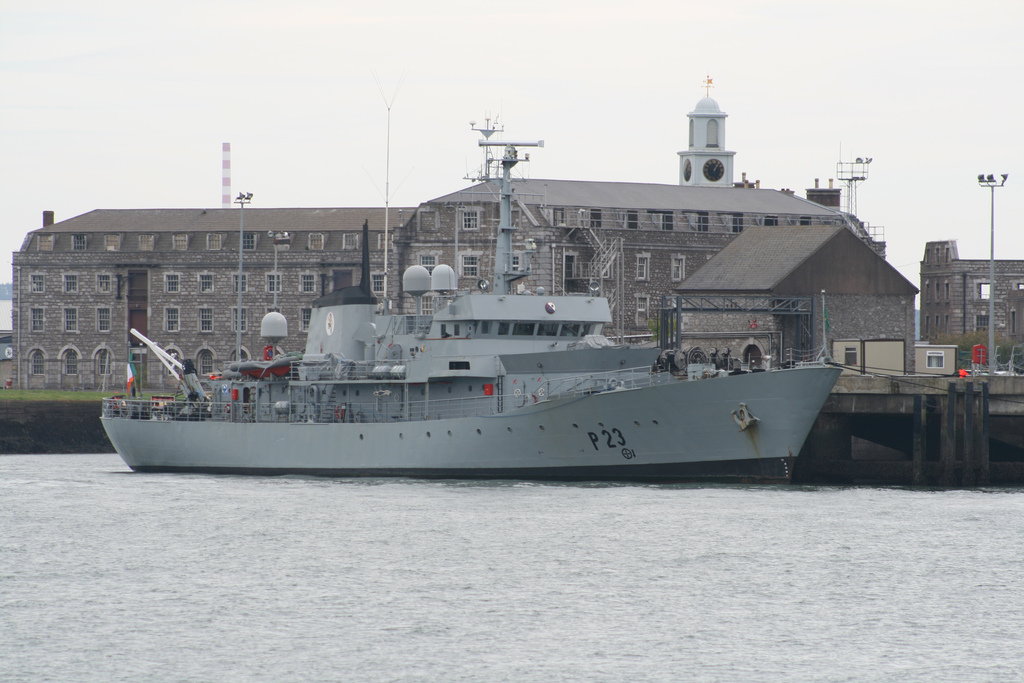
LÉ Aisling

Both HMS Gloucester, a British destroyer, and LÉ Aisling, an Irish Naval Service vessel responded to the scene. Samples of the oil were taken for analysis at the British Maritime and Coastguard Agency's (MCA) labs in Edinburgh, and Ireland requested samples of oils carried on board the Russian vessels via the Russian Embassy in Dublin. The Irish Coast Guard contracted a tug, the Celtic Isle, equipped with oil dispersal equipment from a Cork-based company to assist in the clean-up operation. The tug assessed and attempted to deploy skimmers on 18 February, but the Irish Coast Guard director said that international experience showed that success could be very limited. "unless this fuel oil can be sprayed within the first day of a spill, it is very difficult to deal with, and collection at sea has a success rate of about 1%”. The Celtic Isle stood down by 26 February after having little success in recovering the oil. The EMSA's pollution response vessel for the Atlantic region, the Galway Fisher, also made its way to Cork to take on board anti-pollution equipment and remain on stand-by. The MCA laboratory confirmed that the oil involved was a light crude oil on 21 or 22 February and further results announced on 26 February revealed the oil to be of Russian origin.

=== Local authorities ===
It was reported that both the British and Irish governments had drafted emergency plans for the cleaning of any affected coasts. Oil washed up in Ireland was due to be recovered mechanically by local authorities using bulldozers and skimmers with the assistance and supervision of the Coast Guard. By 23 February it was reported that none of the Wexford, Waterford or Cork local authorities had in place oil pollution response plans as required by law since 1999, but Wexford's plan was almost complete.

=== Russian Navy ===
The Russian Navy vessels left the area around 18 February, having completed refuelling. On 20 February the Russian military stated that it believed that the spill might have been caused during cleaning of the deck of the Admiral Kuznetsov. They dispatched a high-level diplomatic delegation to Ireland to discuss the impact of the spill which included experts in the field and Vice-Admiral Vyacheslav Popov, the deputy commander of the Russian Navy. They met with the Irish Minister of State for the Department of Transport, Noel Ahern, and Irish Coast Guard officials on 23 February. The discussions included an assessment of the cost of recovery of the oil and the determination of liability for the spill.

On 24 February, 10 days after the initial spill, the Russian delegation admitted, with extreme regret, responsibility for the incident. The high-level Russian military delegation told the Irish Coast Guard that the incident may have occurred when bilges were inadvertently pumped out 80 km southeast of Fastnet Rock. The Russian internal investigation stated that "technical malfunction and human error" were the causes of the spill. The Irish and Russian governments still disagreed over the size of the spill with Russian estimates placing it at 20 to 30 tons.

The Irish Coast Guard expressed disappointment that notification of the pollution incident had not been made earlier as this would have made spraying more efficient and reduced potential risk. However, Irish Coast Guard director Chris Reynolds said he accepted the delegation's explanation. The total cost of the Irish government's monitoring operation was estimated at €250,000. Bilateral discussions were held with regards a Russian contribution towards these costs.
