= Erika (given name) =

- Pronunciation: /ˈɛrɪkə/ Italian: [ˈɛːrika] German: [ˈeːʁika] Japanese: [ˈɛːrika]
- Gender: Female

Origin
- Origin: Old Norse, Japanese
- Meaning: "eternal ruler", "ever powerful" (Germanic), "heather"
- Region of origin: Germania, Japan

Other names
- Related names: Eric, Erik, Frederick

The given name Erika is a female name with multiple meanings of Classical Latin, Old Norse, and Japanese origin.

Erika and the variants Erica, Ericka, or Ereka are feminine forms of Eric, derived from the Old Norse name Eiríkr (or Eríkr in Eastern Scandinavia due to monophthongization). The first element, ei- is derived either from the older Proto-Norse *aina(z), meaning "one, alone, unique", as in the form Æinrikr explicitly, or from *aiwa(z) "long time, eternity". The second element -ríkr stems either from *ríks "king, ruler" (cf. Gothic reiks) or from the therefrom derived *ríkijaz "kingly, powerful, rich". The name is thus usually taken to mean "sole ruler, monarch" or "eternal ruler, ever powerful". It is a common name in many Western societies.

The Latin word erica means heath or broom. It is believed that Pliny adapted erica from Ancient Greek ἐρείκη. The expected Anglo-Latin pronunciation, /ɪˈraɪkə/, may be given in dictionaries (OED: "Erica"), but /ˈɛrɪkə/ is more commonly heard. Erica is the name of a genus of about 860 species of flowering plants in the family Ericaceae, commonly known as heaths or heathers in English, and is the Latin word for heather.

Erika (えりか, エリカ) is a common female Japanese given name in Japan. It has multiple meanings depending on the kanji. The Japanese origin of the given name has nothing in common with the Nordic roots of the Western version.

== Authors and poets ==
- Erika Liebman (1738–1803), Swedish poet
- Erika Mann (1905–1969), German writer, the daughter of Thomas Mann
- Erika Mitchell, the real name of author E. L. James (born 1963)

== Fictional characters ==
- Erika, the eponymous character of the German marching song "Erika"
- Erika (Underworld), a character in the film Underworld
- Erika Berger, a character in the novel series Millennium
- Erika Chiba (千葉 エリカ), a character in the web novel series The Irregular at Magic High School
- Erika Ford, a character in the television series Friends
- Erika Furudo (古戸 ヱリカ), a character in the visual novel series Umineko When They Cry
- Erika Kohut, protagonist of the novel The Piano Teacher
- Erika Shiragami (白神 英理加) a character from the movie Godzilla vs Biollante

== Politics ==
- Erika Askeland, American politician
- Erika Conners, American politician
- Erika Harold (born 1980), American attorney, politician, and 2003 Miss America
- Erika Jójárt, Hungarian politician
- Erika Mann (politician) (born 1950), German politician
- Erika Steinbach (born 1943), German politician
- Erika Yoney, American politician

== Science and education ==
- Erika Cremer (1900–1996), German physicist
- Erika Cuellar (born 1978), Bolivian biologist
- Erika Doss (fl. 1980s–2020s), professor of American Studies at the University of Notre Dame
- Erika Hamden, American astrophysicist and Assistant Professor
- Erika Marín-Spiotta, Spanish-born biogeochemist and ecosystem ecologist
- Erika Zavaleta, American ecologist and evolutionary biologist

== Sports ==
=== Basketball ===
- Érika de Souza (born 1982), Brazilian basketball player
- Erika Dobrovičová-Buriánová (born 1967), Slovak basketball player
- Erika Mace (born 2007), Finnish basketball player
- Erika Valek (born 1982), Colombian basketball player

=== Football ===
- Érika (born 1988), Brazilian footballer
- Érika Cristiano dos Santos (born 1988), Brazilian footballer
- Erika Geréd (born 1999), Romanian footballer
- Érika González (born 2004), Spanish footballer
- Ērika Gricienko (born 2002), Latvian footballer
- Erika Hernández (born 1999), Panamanian footballer
- Erika Karlsson (born 1987), Swedish retired footballer
- Erika O'Shea (born 2002), Gaelic football player
- Érika Salvatierra (born 1990), Bolivian footballer
- Érika Sâmia (born 1996), Brazilian former footballer
- Erika Santoro (born 1999), Italian footballer
- Erika Skarbø (born 1987), Norwegian former footballer
- Erika Vanegas (born 1988), Mexican former footballer
- Erika Vásquez (born 1983), Ecuadorian footballer
- Erika Vázquez (born 1983), Spanish footballer

=== Gymnastics ===
- Erika Akiyama (born 1964), Japanese rhythmic gymnast
- Erika Bogovic (born 1934), Austrian gymnast
- Erika Csányi (born 1965), Hungarian gymnast
- Erika Enzenhofer (1926–2024), Austrian gymnast
- Erika Fasana (born 1996), Italian gymnast
- Erika Flander (born 1965), Hungarian gymnast
- Erika Pinxten (born 2007), Belgian artistic gymnast
- Erika Rusak (born 2008), American rhythmic gymnast
- Erika Schiller (gymnast) (born 1960), Soviet rhythmic gymnast
- Erika-Leigh Stirton (born 1980), Canadian rhythmic gymnast
- Erika Zafirova (born 1999), Bulgarian gymnast
- Erika Zhailauova (born 2007), Kazakhstani rhythmic gymnast
- Erika Zuchold (1947–2015), German gymnast

=== Swimming ===
- Erika Bricker (born 1949), American swimmer
- Erika Connolly (born 1998), retired American swimmer
- Erika Fairweather (born 2003), New Zealand swimmer
- Erika Ferraioli (born 1986), Italian swimmer
- Erika González (born 1972), Mexican freestyle swimmer
- Erika Graf (born 1977), Uruguayan swimmer
- Erika Hansen (born 1970), American swimmer
- Erika Komura (born 1982), Japanese synchronized swimmer
- Erika Leal-Ramirez (born 1977), Mexican swimmer
- Érika MacDavid (born 1970), Brazilian synchronized swimmer
- Erika Nara (born 1978), Japanese Paralympic swimmer
- Erika Rüegg (1952–2015), Swiss breaststroke swimmer
- Erika Seltenreich-Hodgson (born 1995), Canadian swimmer
- Erika Stewart (born 1990), American swimmer

=== Track and field ===
- Erika Abril (born 1978), Colombian long-distance runner
- Erika Csomor (born 1973) , Hungarian long-distance runner
- Erika Fazekas-Veréb (born 1963), Hungarian long-distance runner
- Erika Fisch (1934–2021), German long jumper
- Erika Furlani (born 1996), Italian high jumper
- Erika Kemp (born 1995), American runner
- Erika Keresztesi (born 1987), Hungarian sprinter
- Erika Kinsey (born 1988), Swedish high jumper
- Erika Rudolf (1954–2009), Hungarian high jumper
- Erika Saraceni (born 2006), Italian triple jumper
- Érika Olivera (born 1976), Chilean marathon runner
- Erika Seyama (born 1994), Swazi high jumper

=== Volleyball ===
- Erika Araki (born 1984), Japanese national volleyball team captain
- Érika Coimbra (born 1980), Brazilian volleyball player
- Erika Deloria (born 2001), Filipino volleyball player
- Erika Heucke (born 1942), German former volleyball player
- Erika Mercado (born 1992), Ecuadorian-Argentine volleyball player
- Erika Mota (born 1995), Dominican volleyball player
- Erika Nyström (born 1983), Finnish-Cypriot vollyeball player
- Erika Santos (born 1999), Filipino volleyball player

=== Other sports ===
- Erika Akaya (born 1990), Japanese field hockey player
- Erika Alarcón, Paraguayan roller skater
- Erika deLone, (born 1972), American tennis player
- Erika Doornbos (born 1956), Dutch curler
- Erika Hara (born 1999), Japanese professional golfer
- Erika Kirpu (born 1992), Estonian épée fencer
- Erika Schmutz (born 1973), Canadian wheelchair rugby player and power engineer

== Entertainment ==
=== Actresses ===
- Erika Alexander (born 1969), American actress
- Erika Anderson, American actress
- Erika Buenfil (born 1963), Mexican actress
- Erika Christensen (born 1982), American actress
- Erika Eleniak (born 1969), American actress and Playboy Playmate
- Erika Henningsen (born 1992), American actress and singer
- Erika Kaljusaar (born 1956), Estonian actress
- Erika Pluhar (born 1939), Austrian actress, singer and author
- Erika Slezak (born 1946), American actress best known for her long-running role as Viki Davidson on One Life to Live
- Erika Stárková (born 1984), Czech actress
- Erika Toda (戸田 恵梨香, born 1988), Japanese actress

=== Models ===
- Erika Heynatz (born 1975), Australian model, actress, singer and television personality
- Erika Sawajiri (沢尻 エリカ, born 1986), Japanese gravure model, singer and actress
- Erika Yazawa (born 1990), Japanese gravure model, actress and member of Idoling!!!

=== Singers and musicians ===
- Erika Amato (born 1969), American singer and actress
- Erika de Casier (born 1989 or 1990), Danish singer, songwriter, and record producer
- Erika Ender (born 1974), Panamanian singer, songwriter and actress
- Erika Jayne, dance and electronica artist, actress and television personality
- Erika Nissen (1845–1903), Norwegian pianist
- Erika Raum (born 1972), Canadian violinist
- Erika Umeda (born 1991), Japanese singer and model, former member of Cute
- Erika Vikman (born 1993), Finnish singer and songwriter
- Erykah Badu (born 1971), American singer-songwriter, record producer, activist, and actress
- Érika Alcocer Luna (born 1974), Mexican singer, winner of the second generation of La Academia

=== Theatre ===
- Erika Andia, Bolivian theatre actress, director and journalist
- Erika Dickerson-Despenza, American playwright

=== Voice actresses ===
- Erika Harlacher (born 1990), American voice actress
- Erika Ishii (born 1987), American actor and host
- Erika Scheimer (born 1960), American former voice actress

== Other ==
- Erika Abels d'Albert (1896–1975), Austrian painter and graphic artist
- Erika Aittamaa (1866–1952), Swedish artisan of Tornedalian descent
- Erika Allen, co-founder and CEO of Urban Growers Collective
- Erika Anderson (engineer) (1989–2023), American mechanical engineer
- Erika Billeter (1927–2011), German-born Swiss curator, art historian, writer, and museum director
- Erika Chambers (born 1948), British-Israeli Mossad operative
- Erika Cosby, American painter and daughter of Bill Cosby
- Erika Costell (born 1993), American YouTuber, model, and singer
- Erika Fuchs (1906–2005), German translator
- Erika Jonn (1865–1931), Swedish artist
- Erika Kirk (born 1988), American businesswoman and wife of Charlie Kirk
- Erika Sifrit (born 1978), American murderer
- Erika von Brockdorff (1911–1943), German resistance fighter during the Second World War
- Erika Wendt (1917–2003), German WWII spy

== See also ==
- Erika (disambiguation)
- Erica (given name)
- Ericka
