= Ericka =

Name for girls

Ericka, or Éricka is a girl's given name, a variant of Erica and Erika.

People with the name include:

- Ericka Bareigts (born 1967), French politician
- Ericka Beckman, American visual artist and filmmaker
- Ericka Cruz (born 1981), Mexican athlete, model and beauty titleholder
- Ericka Dunlap (born 1981), American model
- Ericka Gracia (born 1989), Ecuadorian footballer
- Ericka Hart (born 1986), American academic
- Ericka Huggins (born 1948), American activist
- Ericka Hunter (born 1982), Canadian singer-songwriter and dancer
- Ericka Jane (born 1995), Danish musical artist
- Ericka Lorenz (born 1981), American water poloist
- Ericka Portilla (born 1985), Chilean lawyer and politician
- Ericka Rere (born 1963), New Zealand rugby union player
- Ericka Walker (born 1981), American artist
