= Erika White =

Erika White may refer to:

- Erika Page White, American actress
- Erika White (politician), member of the Ohio House of Representatives

== See also ==
- Erica White, American basketball player
- Erica White (artist), British sculptor and portrait painter
