= Erica =

Erica or ERICA may refer to:

- Erica (given name)
- Erica (plant), a flowering plant genus
- Erica (chatbot), a service of Bank of America
- Erica (video game), a 2019 FMV video game
- Erica (spider), a jumping spider genus
- Erica, Emmen, a village in Drenthe, the Netherlands
- Erica, Victoria, a town in Australia
  - Erica railway station
- ERICA:
  - Experiment on Rapidly Intensifying Cyclones over the Atlantic, a meteorological system
  - Embryo Ranking Intelligent Classification Algorithm, an AI tool for embryologists
  - Hanyang University ERICA campus
- HMS Erica (K50) (1940–1943), a British Royal Navy corvette
- SS Erica, an Italian steamship in service 1935-40
- Erica, a 1970s public television program starring Erica Wilson
- Being Erica, a 2009 Canadian comedy television series.

== See also ==
- Frederica (disambiguation)
- Arica (disambiguation)
