= Daes =

Daes may refer to:

- Daes (Δάης), ancient Greek historian from Kolonai
- Erica-Irene Daes (1925–2017), academic, diplomat and United Nations expert
- DAEs, Differential-algebraic system of equations
- Daes, DJ/Producer
