= CloudSight =

Computer software developer

CloudSight, Inc.
- Type: Private
- Industry: Internet; Computer software; Computer vision
- Founded: 2012; 14 years ago
- Founders: Dominik Mazur; Bradford Folkens
- Headquarters: Los Angeles, California
- Area served: Worldwide
- Key people: Bradford Folkens (CEO); Chris Weilemann (CTO)
- Products: CloudSight API; CamFind; TapTapSee
- Website: cloudsight.ai

CloudSight, Inc. is a Los Angeles, California–based technology company that specializes in captioning and understanding images using AI.

== History ==
CloudSight was founded in 2012 by Dominik Mazur and Bradford Folkens. It was previously known as Image Searcher, Inc. and then CamFind, Inc., respectively. In 2016, the company was officially rebranded as CloudSight, Inc.

As of August 2022, CloudSight has 15+ granted patents for its technology and has recognized over 1 billion images.

== Products ==
=== TapTapSee ===
On October 11, 2012, CloudSight released TapTapSee, its first mobile application, on the AppStore. TapTapSee is a mobile camera application designed specifically for blind and visually impaired iOS and Android users. The application utilizes the device's camera and VoiceOver functions to photograph objects, identify them and communicate this information to the user.

TapTapSee was the 2014 recipient of the Access Award by the American Foundation for the Blind. In March 2013, TapTapSee was named App of the Month by the Royal National Institute for the Blind. At the end of 2013, TapTapSee was elected into the AppleVis iOS Hall of Fame.

=== CamFind ===
On April 7, 2013, CloudSight released its second mobile application, CamFind. The application is a visual search engine application that utilizes image recognition to photograph, identify, and provide information on any object, at any angle. Its image recognition capabilities make use of CloudSight API.

CamFind surpassed 1,000,000 downloads within the first seven months after its release into the Apple AppStore. The mobile application is also available in the Google Play Store, and between the two platforms it has received a combined 31,000,000+ downloads as of 2022. In February 2015, CamFind was released on Google Glass via MyGlass.

=== CloudSight API ===
In September 2013, CloudSight released its CloudSight API to the general public. The CloudSight API employs deep learning methods

=== Google Cloud Marketplace ===
On June 2, 2020, CloudSight announced the availability of their neural network products on Google Cloud Marketplace as part of a collaboration with Google Cloud.
