= Santa Maria Island Station =

Coordinates: 36°59′50.10″N 25°8′8.60″W

Santa Maria Island Station (also known as SMA or Montes das Flores, Hill of Flowers) is an ESTRACK satellite ground station in the Azores, 5 kilometres (3.1 mi) from the town of Vila do Porto on the island of Santa Maria.

== ESTRACK Station ==
The Station currently operates a 5.5m S-band antenna capable of receiving signals in the 2200-2300 MHz range, the first one in the ESTRACK network with launch tracking capability. It covers a large portion of the Atlantic Ocean and during the Ariane 5 launches, it acquires signals until the upper stage engine cut-off. The station is also able to receive X-band in the range of 8025-8400 MHz.

Construction of the station was completed in January 2008 under Ariane Development Programme in an agreement between ESA and the Portuguese government. A reason for building an additional station was tracking of the medium inclination Ariane 5 launches and upcoming Vega along with Soyuz from Guiana Space Centre. The first launch tracked by the newly built site was Ariane 5 ES flight V-181 lifting Automated Transfer Vehicle Jules Verne in March 2008. After the end of the ATV programme, the station is primarily used for launches from Kourou carrying Galileo satellites. In the future the station will be upgraded to support the Space Rider programme.

When not used for launch tracking station is used in CleanSeaNet and MARISS service for Copernicus Programme

== Other Installations ==
Apart from the ESTRACK station the teleport also hosts a number of other antennas:

- The site hosts a Galileo Sensor Station, that is used to monitor the navigation signals, from which corrections to the satellites and the reference frame can be computed. A VSAT terminal is also part of the installation to connect the station with the control centers.
- Leafspace operates two 3.7m antennas that are capable to transmit in S-Band as well as receive in S- and X-Band. The antennas are mainly used for small satellites.
- PT Space took over the 15m ESTRACK antenna in Perth in 2015 from ESA and transferred it to Santa Maria. The plan was to support the Proba-3 mission. In 2024 the AEROS MH-1 satellite became the first user of the station.
- EUMETSAT operates a X-Band receive station for direct data distribution from the EPS-SG satellites.
- LeoLabs operates a space radar to track objects in orbit around earth.

Furthermore, the local company Edisoft works with various other users to host smaller antennas or to sell spare capacity on existing ones.
