= Erika (law) =

The Erika legislative packages of the European Union are maritime laws intended to improve safety in the shipping industry and thereby reduce environmental damage to the oceans.

The packages are named after the oil tanker Erika, which broke apart in a storm in the Bay of Biscay off the coast of France in 1999, spilling over 10,000 tonnes of heavy fuel oil, polluting 400 kilometres (250 mi) of coastline. This incident prompted the EU to pass the first two measures addressing maritime safety. The third package was spurred in part by the 2002 sinking of the oil tanker Prestige off the coasts of Spain and France. That accident, the largest environmental disaster in Spain's history, was caused in part because Spanish authorities denied the distressed vessel entry to a safe harbour. European Council officials claim that the Prestige disaster would not have been possible if the first two Erika packages had been fully implemented and enforced at the time.

The Erika packages comprise modifications of the existing legislation (Erika I), innovations in the EU law (Erika II), and integrate international standards with the Community legislation (Erika III). The laws reinforce certification requirements for shipping and establish inspection and verification controls. They also imply greater responsibilities for the shipping companies. Each EU country was required to install appropriate authorities and new or reinforced methods of control.

== Erika I ==
In March 2000, the European Commission presented three proposals for "immediate actions" to modify the standards in force relating to tankers and ships transporting dangerous or polluting material. These regulations entered into force on 22 July 2003.

=== Port state control ===
The first proposal amended Directive 95/21/EC to control the entry of ships into EU ports. Ships older than 15 years that have been detained more than twice in the previous two years are added to a "blacklist" published by the commission, and are denied entry to any EU port. As ships get older, they are subject to increasing levels of inspection. Inspections must target one of the ballast tanks. Ships are required to communicate certain information before entering ports to facilitate inspection.

=== Classification societies ===
The second proposal, related to Directive 2001/105/EC, more strictly monitors the classification societies that inspect ship quality on behalf of EU member states. It places more stringent criteria on the societies, and gives the commission the right to suspend or withdraw recognition from societies that fail to comply with the Directive using a simplified procedure.

=== Double-hull oil tankers ===
The last proposal speeds up the replacement of single-hull oil tankers with double-hull designs, which are less likely to leak. As of 1 January 2010, single-hull crude oil tankers of 20,000 tons deadweight, or product carriers of 30,000 tons deadweight, are banned from the ports and internal waters of EU member states. Single-hull oil tankers of both types of 600 tons deadweight or more will be banned by 2015, or when they reach 25 to 30 years of age depending upon the tanker's regulatory status.

=== Enactment of Erika I ===
The European Union Directives required member states to enact national laws enabling these rules by 22 July 2003. As of 25 July 2003, only Denmark, France, Germany, Spain, and the United Kingdom had done so, leading the European Commission to initiate legal proceedings against 10 other member states that had failed to do so.

In June 2004, France was found to have failed to fulfil its inspection duties under Erika I by the European Court of Justice. France blamed the failure on personnel shortages.

== Erika II ==
Following the first series of regulations, the Commission proposed a second set of legislation consisting of one Directive and two Regulations. These measures were intended to bring lasting improvements in the protection of European waters against accidents at sea and marine pollution.

=== Maritime traffic monitoring and control ===
Directive 2002/59/EC established a maritime-vessel monitoring, control, and information system. Because 90 per cent of the EU's external trade is seaborne, and the ocean trade routes with Europe have notable geographic chokepoints like the Strait of Dover and the Strait of Gibraltar, heavy oceangoing traffic can occur, increasing the risk of an environmental accident. Therefore, a traffic monitoring and control system reduces the risk of accidents.

All ships of 300 gross tonnage and upwards, regardless of cargo, are covered. Exceptions are made for warships; fishing vessels, traditional ships, and recreational craft less than 45 metres (148 ft) in length, and bunkers below 5,000 tons.

Ships bound for EU ports must notify the port authority 24 hours in advance, when feasible. Ships must have an Automatic Identification System (AIS) and a Voyage Data Recorder (VDR) system (a "black box" for ships, used for accident investigations).

Dangerous or polluting goods on board a ship must be declared by the shipper to the master or operator of the vessel, who must then in turn provide the information to the authorities. The master of a ship is required to immediately report any incident or accident affecting the safety of the ship or other shipping, any sightings of polluting materials or drifting containers, and any situation liable to lead to pollution of EU waters or shores.

In poor weather, ships may be prevented from leaving port. EU member states are required to provide places of refuge for ships in distress.

=== COPE Fund ===
A proposed regulation would set up the COPE Fund, a compensation fund for victims of oil spills in European waters. The fund would compensate victims with justified claims that exceed the international regieme's compensation limit of 200 million Euros. The fund's compensation limit is €1,000,000,000. It is proportionally financed by European businesses that receive more than 150,000 tonnes of crude oil and heavy fuel per year.

This regulation also provides financial penalties for those found guilty of grossly negligent behaviour in the transport of oil by sea.

=== European Maritime Safety Agency ===
Regulation (EC) No 1406/2002 created the European Maritime Safety Agency. The agency was created "to ensure a high, uniform and effective level of maritime safety and prevention of pollution by ships in the Community."

== Erika III ==
The third and final maritime safety package addressed civil liability and flag states. The Prestige oil spill showed that the existing regulations were inadequate, according to the Parliament member that guided the legislation. "We could have avoided the Prestige oil spill," said Loyola de Palacio, vice-president in charge of Transport and Energy, claiming that the spill would not have happened if the European Commission's Erika I and II proposals had been fully adopted and implemented.

The Commission proposed the package on 23 November 2005. The European Parliament adopted the package on 11 March 2009. The laws entered into force on 17 June 2009, although the directives must then be implemented by the domestic laws of the member states before they become effective.

=== Flag States ===
Directive 2009/21/EC requires that the flags of all EU countries have good standing, and not be on the black or grey list established by the Paris Memorandum of Understanding on Port State Control. It also codifies the International Maritime Organization's flag-state audit scheme into law.

=== Classification societies ===
The existing directive covering classification societies was split into Regulation (EC) 391/2009 (containing a recognition scheme, obligations, and penalties) and Directive 2009/15/EC (governing relations between EU countries and recognised classification societies).

The societies must set up an independent joint body to certify their quality-management systems. Organizations can be fined, or have their recognition withdrawn, if they fail to do their job properly. Approved societies must co-operate, recognising each other's classification certificates when the relevant regulations are equivalent.

=== Port State Control ===
Directive 2009/16/EC reformed the EU's Port State Control scheme. All ships calling on EU ports must be inspected, even if they only rarely visit the EU. A risk profile is established for each ship, based on its type, age, flag, company history, and detainment history. Depending on the risk profile, ships may be inspected as often as every six months, or as infrequently as every three years. Substandard ships are subject to a mandatory minimum ban period, and repeat offenders may be permanently banned. This provision was controversial, with some member states of the EU arguing that the costs would be too great. All five Maltese ministers of the European Parliament voted against the measures; the Erika, the vessel whose oil spill spurred the creation of these laws, was a Maltese-flagged vessel.

The directive also establishes a blacklist of companies operating substandard ships, published under the Paris Memorandum of Understanding on Port State Control.

Increased qualification and training requirements for Port State Control inspectors are also included in the directive.

=== Traffic monitoring ===
Erika II's traffic-monitoring requirements were amended by Directive 2009/17/EC, enhancing the traffic monitoring requirements. The directive sets SafeSeaNet as the standard maritime data exchange system for the EU, and establishes a European center to collect identification data and monitor shipping.

The "place of refuge" provision of the original directive was revised with more detailed rules, in response to the Prestige spill.

Under the amendments, all fishing vessels over 15 metres (49 ft) in length will eventually be equipped with AIS.

The amendments also provide for information and prevention measures when ice formation places shipping at risk.

=== Accident investigation ===
Directive 2009/18/EC provides guidelines for technical investigations and dissemination of "lessons learnt" following accidents at sea. It is based on the International Maritime Organization's existing code requirements, giving the principles of that code the force of law. With this directive, maritime accidents now have rules about technical investigations similar to those for civil-aviation and railway accidents.

=== Passenger carrier liability ===
A modern and uniform set of rules for compensating passengers who are the victim of an accident at sea was established by Regulation (EC) No 392/2009. It extends the IMO's Athens Convention, which was already part of EU law.

In the case of sinking, collision, or shipwreck, victims no longer have to prove the carrier was at fault, and may receive up to €464,000 in damages as set by a judge. However, for accidental injuries like slips and falls, the victim must still prove fault. All carriers must be insured, and victims may apply directly to the insurance company for compensation. Compensation for lost or damaged luggage is set at €2,587.

These improvements will take effect by 2013, at which time all Europeans travelling between countries will enjoy these protections. The regulation will eventually be extended to domestic travel as well.

This regulation was initially opposed by some member states.

=== Shipowner insurance ===
Before Directive 2009/20/EC was enacted, there was no legal requirement for European shipowners to carry insurance against damage to third parties caused by their ships. International law does not require such insurance. The directive requires European-flagged ships to carry coverage consistent with the International Maritime Organization's 1996 Convention on Limitation of Liability for Maritime Claims (LLMC 1996) by 1 January 2012.

The trade association BIMCO called this provision "virtually toothless", noting that it generally reflects the current insurance regime.
