= Vladimir Kagan =

American furniture designer (1927–2016)

Vladimir Kagan (August 29, 1927 – April 7, 2016) was an American furniture designer. He was inducted in the Interior Designer Hall of Fame in 2009, 62 years after he started designing and producing furniture.

His Midcentury modern furniture with "Sinuous wooden frame characteristics" has a modern feel. His style, inspired by everything from antiques and nature to the Bauhaus, emphasizes comfort and functionality.

He was married to the embroidery designer Erica Wilson (1928–2011). Together they had three children.

== Early life and education ==
Vladimir Kagan was born on August 29, 1927, in Worms, Germany, The son of a Russian Jewish cabinetmaker, Vladimir Kagan's childhood was cut short by the rise of the Nazis. He emigrated to the United States in 1938. His early focus was painting and sculpture but in the following years he became eagerly attracted to architecture and design. Graduated from the School of Industrial Art in 1946, where he was an architecture major and then went on to study architecture at Columbia University.

In 1947 he joined his father Illi Kagan, a master cabinetmaker to work in his woodworking shop and learn furniture making from the ground up. In an interview he recalls his "father saying 'Measure three times and cut once'; I would be of the school of cut three times and never measure"

He opened his first personal shop in New York in 1949. In 1950 the Kagan-Dreyfus partnership began with a showroom/store on 125 East 57th Street in New York City. His early work included furniture for the Delegate's Cocktail Lounge at the United Nations and furniture for the "Monsanto House of the Future" at Disneyland.

In April 2016, Kagan died due to a heart attack.

Kagan developed a reputation that earned him numerous design projects as well as a celebrity clientele. Some of his early clients included:

- Marilyn Monroe
- Lily Pons
- Xavier Cugat
- Gary Cooper

and companies such as:

- Walt Disney
- General Electric
- General Motors
- Prudential Insurance
- Monsanto
- Fairchild Aircraft

== Teaching ==
Vladimir Kagan has served as chairman of the Advisory commission of the High School of Art and Design in New York. Member of numerous committees for the Architectural League of New York. Served on the faculty of Parsons The New School for Design and lectured extensively on the history of modern design in furniture and architecture. In 2001 received an honorary doctor of Art and Design from Kendall College of Art and Design. Received an honorary doctorate from the New York School of Interior design in 2009. Lectured at Yale University in 2010. Lectured at Philadelphia University in 2014.

== Interior and product design ==
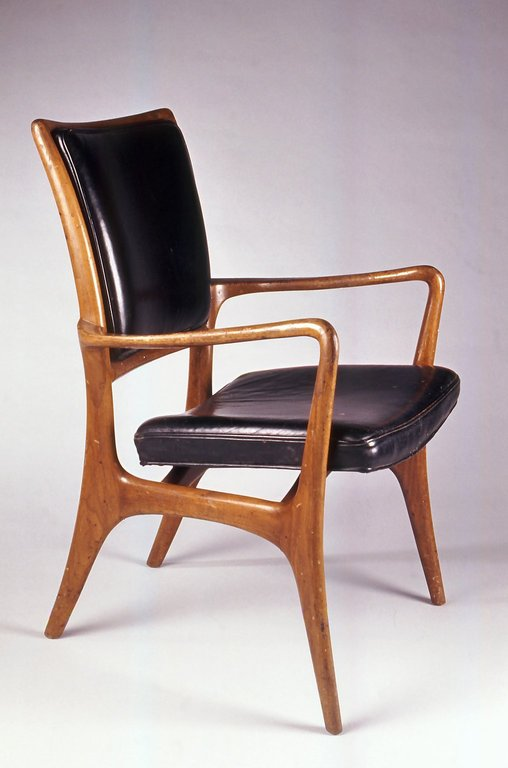
Armchair, ca. 1953. Brooklyn Museum

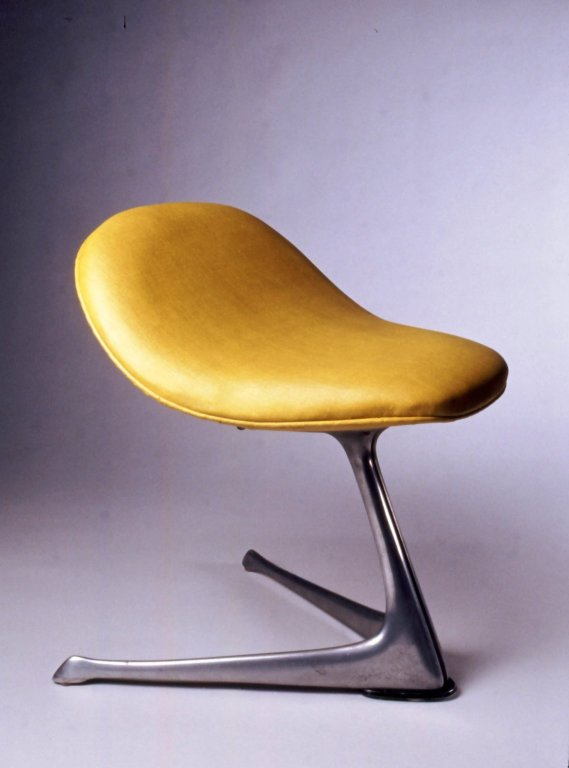
Vladimir Kagan Designs. Stool. ca. 1960 Brooklyn Museum

Vladimir Kagan creates his designs with upholstery, wrought iron, cast aluminum and especially organically sculpted wood in works that became hallmarks of his career. Kagan introduces his first signature furniture collection called 'Tri-symmetric' in 1949. In 1958 Kagan designs "capricorn", an indoor-outdoor iron collection through W&J Sloan. After the partnership with Dreyfus dissolves in 1960, Kagan continued exploring fresh forms and materials. In 1964, Kagan redesigns the Monsanto House of the Future at Disneyland, in California. In 1970 the first Omnibus collection is introduced. His company continued to function under the new name Vladimir Kagan Designs. On May 19, 1972, a fire destroyed Kagan's entire factory in New York. In 1974 Kagan designs the executive suite for Prudential Insurance Co. in Newark, New Jersey. In 1975 Kagan designs the office of Warner Communications' senior vice president In 1987 he closes the factory and showroom and starts his new consulting firm: The Vladimir Kagan Design Group. In 1997 Gucci uses his Omnibus collection for all its 360 stores around the world. In 2001 Kagan designs a Bombay Sapphire martini glass. In 2002 he designs the lobby for the Standard Hotel Downtown in Los Angeles.

== Awards and international recognition ==
- 1949 – Kagan's wrought iron chair is selected for the Museum of Modern Art Good Design Award
- 1990 – Kagan is elected president of the New York chapter of ASID
- 2000 – Kagan receives the Pinnacle Award from the American Society of Furniture Designers
- 2001 – Kagan receives the Lifetime Achievement Award from the American Society of Furniture Designers
- 2002 – Kagan receives the Lifetime Achievement Award, from the Brooklyn Museum of art.
- 2004 – Kagan is nominated for the Lifetime Achievement Award and an Environmental Design Award from the Smithsonian Institution's Cooper-Hewitt National Design Museums's National Design Awards Programs.
- 2007 – Kagan receives the Product Design Award from the American Society of Interior Designers
- 2011 – Kagan receives the Artist Visionary Award from the Museum of Arts and Design
