= CamFind =

Visual search app

- Developers: CloudSight, Inc.
Stable release
- Android: 5.0.2.3 / June 15, 2019; 7 years ago
- iOS: 5.0.9 / November 11, 2019; 6 years ago
- Operating system: iOS 10.0 or later, Android 5.0 or later
- Size: 125.9 MB (iOS); 11 MB (Android)
- Available in: English
- Website: camfindapp.com

CamFind is a visual search and image recognition mobile app developed by Image Searcher, Inc. in 2013 under CEO, Dominik Mazur. The company is based in Los Angeles, California, and centers around image recognition.

Powered by their API, CloudSight, it allows users to identify any item by taking a picture with their smartphone, providing information including related images, local shopping results, price comparisons and web results. It has been downloaded more than 42 million times and has identified over 550 million images.

== History ==
In 2013, CamFind had over 1 million users.

As of April 2015, CamFind's newest 4.0 release made it the first mobile visual search engine to include social features, such as the ability to like and favorite images shared around the world, as well as new 'live' and 'popular' image stream feeds.

== Critique ==
In her 2015 artwork work Body Scan (2015), digital artist Erica Scourti used CamFind on her own body. She created a video poem of the shopping sites and ads the app produced in response to images of her toes, breasts, legs and other body parts, expressing a strong critique of the commercialisation of personal images that apps like CamFind perform.
