= Erica Lennard =

American artist

- Born: 1950 (age 75–76)

Erica Lennard (born 1950) is an American photographer. Her work is included in the collections of the Smithsonian American Art Museum, the Davison Art Center at Wesleyan University, the Allen Memorial Art Museum at Oberlin College, and the Centre Pompidou, Paris.

== Books ==
- Sunday, with a text by Elizabeth Lennard, Lustrum Press, 1973.
- Les femmes, les sœurs, with an afterword by Marguerite Duras. Paris: Éditions des Femmes, 1976. Translated into English: Women, Sisters. Indianapolis: Bobbs-Merrill, 1978.
- Classic Gardens, with a text by William Howard Adams, Lustrum Press, 1982.
- With Madison Cox (text): Artists’ Gardens, From Claude Monet to Jennifer Bartlett. New York: Abrams, 1993.
- With Francesca Premoli-Droulers (text), Maisons d'écrivains. Paris: Chêne, 1994; Writers’ Houses. Palm Beach: Vendome, 1995.
- With Éliane Georges (text). Les petits palais du Rajasthan. Paris: Chêne, 1996.
- With Catherine Sauvat (text). Villes d'eaux en Europe. Paris: Chêne, 1999.
- With Ismail Merchant (text). Ismail Merchant’s Paris, Filming and Feasting in France. New York: Abrams, 1999.
- With Alexandra D’Arnoux and Bruno de Laubadère. Gardens by the sea. New York: Clarkson Potter, 2002.
- With Adele Cygelman. Secret Gardens of Hollywood. New York: Universe, 2003.
- With McClatchy, J.D. (text), American Writers at Home. New York: The Library of America and Vendome Press, 2004.
