= Erica Basnicki =

Canadian writer

- Born: 1980 (age 45–46)
- Occupation: writer
- Writing career
- Language: English

Erica Basnicki is a Canadian writer who first rose to prominence because her opinions were sought because she was a vocal surviving relative of a victim of al Qaeda's 2001 attack on the World Trade Center.

In 1998, while still a high school student at Richview Collegiate Institute, Basnicki wrote an article for the Toronto Star about an upcoming teacher's strike.

Basnicki was chosen to read the names of the 24 Canadians who died on September 11, 2001, during a memorial ceremony on September 11, 2002.
