= Erika analalava =

Scientific classification
- Kingdom: Animalia
- Phylum: Arthropoda
- Class: Insecta
- Order: Lepidoptera
- Superfamily: Noctuoidea
- Family: Erebidae
- Subfamily: Lymantriinae
- Tribe: Lymantriini
- Genus: Erika; Griveaud, 1976
- Species: E. analalava

Binomial name
- Erika analalava Griveaud, 1976

Species of moth

Erika analalava is the only species in the monotypic moth genus Erika of the subfamily Lymantriinae. It is found on Madagascar. Both the genus and the species were first described by Paul Griveaud in 1976.
