= Erica Martrece Wilson =

American volleyball player (born 1991)

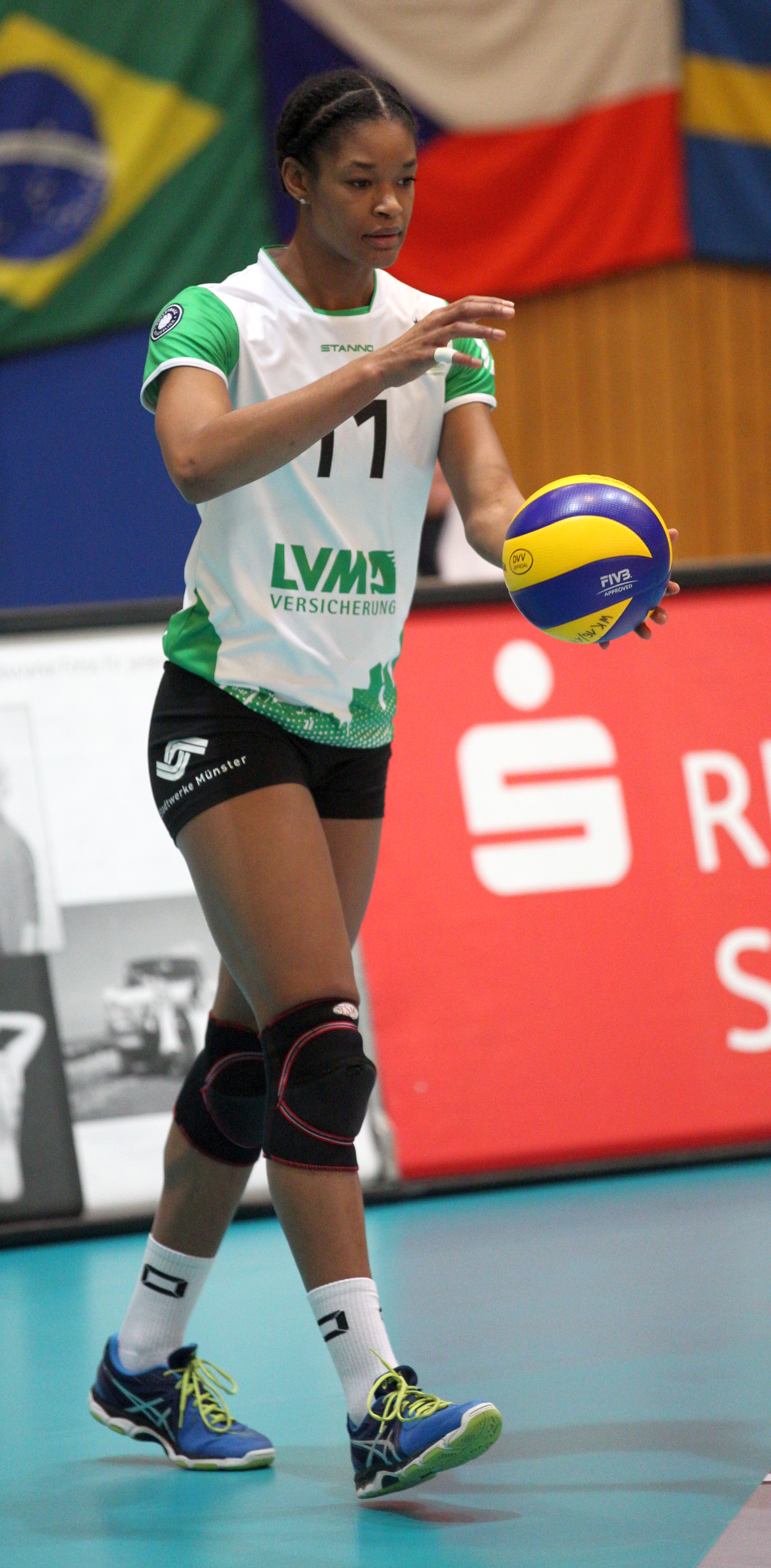
- playing for USC Münster on 4 February 2017, by Sandro Halank

Personal information
- Born: May 26, 1991 (age 35); Akron
- Hometown: Oceanside, California
- Spike: 312 cm (123 in)
- Block: 305 cm (120 in)
- Education: Arizona State University

Volleyball information
- Current club: USC Münster
- Number: 10

National team
United States

Erica Martrece Wilson (born May 26, 1991 Akron) is an American volleyball player who plays in the German Women's Volleyball League (de:Championnat d'Allemagne de volley-ball féminin).

== Playing career ==
She played for Arizona State University. She participated at the 2015–16 Women's CEV Cup, with Volley Köniz.

== Clubs ==
Club	From	To
USA Arizona State University	2009-2010	2011-2012
GER Köpenicker SC	2014-2015	2014-2015
SUI Volley Köniz	2015-2016	2015-2016
GER USC Münster	2016-2017	…
PHI Cignal HD Spikers	2019	2019
