= Erica Frank =

American medical researcher

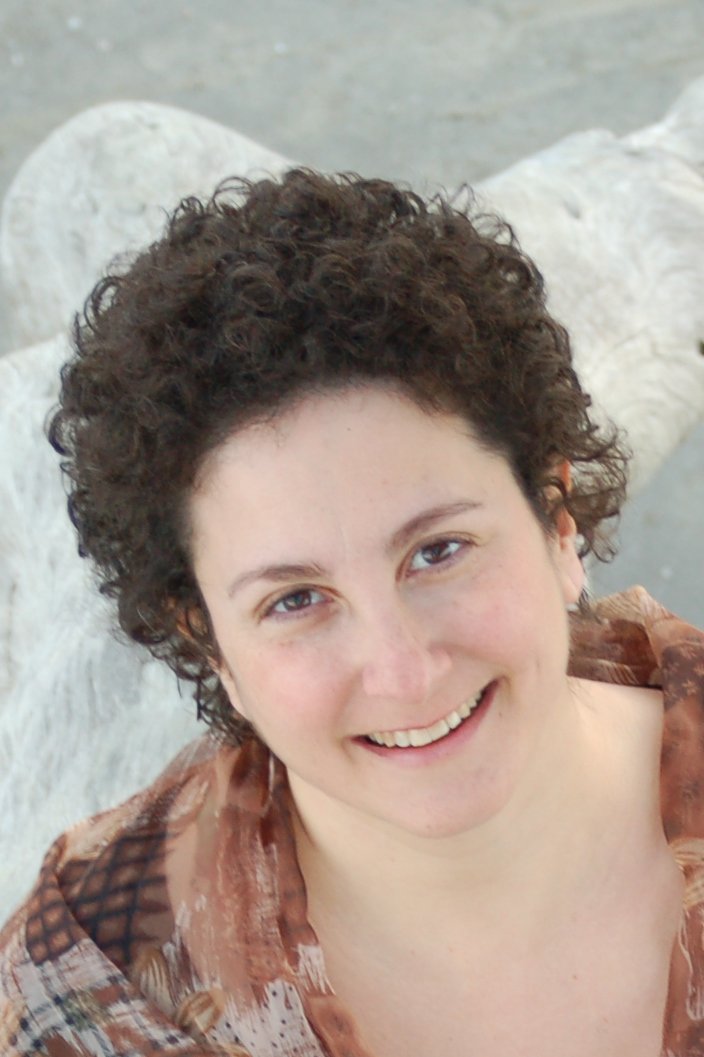
- Born: Erica Frank; 1962 (age 63–64)
- Education: Smith College; Mercer University; Emory University; Yale University; Stanford University
- Occupations: Physician, medical researcher
- Medical career
- Institutions: Cleveland Clinic; Yale University; Stanford University; United States Centers for Disease Control (CDC); University of British Columbia
- Sub-specialties: Preventive medicine
- Research: Preventive medicine
- Awards: American Medical Association Pettis Award (1987); American College of Preventive Medicine Rising Star Award (1996); Rollins School of Public Health Outstanding Alumnus Award (1998); National Cancer Institute Director's Group Award (2012); American College of Preventive Medicine Distinguished Service Award (2012)

Erica Frank is a U.S.-born educational inventor, physician, medical and educational researcher, professor, politician, and public health advocate. Since 2006, she has been a professor in the Faculty of Medicine at the University of British Columbia (UBC); she is the Inventor/Founder of NextGenU.org, and the steward of the 1985 Nobel Peace Prize commemorative medal awarded to the International Physicians for the Prevention of Nuclear War - Canada.

== Education ==
Frank (born in 1962) received a B.A. in Honors and Independent Studies degree from Smith College in Northampton, Massachusetts in 1982, an M.D. degree in 1988 from Mercer University (Macon, Georgia) and an M.P.H. degree in 1984, with an emphasis on Health Education and Epidemiology, from Emory University (Atlanta, Georgia). She interned from 1988 to 1989 at the Cleveland Clinic (Cleveland, Ohio), completed a preventive medicine residency in 1990 at Yale University (New Haven, Connecticut), was an NIH Prevention Research Fellow from 1990 to 1993 at Stanford University (Palo Alto, California) in preventive medicine, and is board certified in preventive medicine and a Fellow of the American College of Preventive Medicine.

== Professional experience ==
In 2006, Frank became the Tier I Canada Research Chair in Preventive Medicine and Population Health at UBC. Before moving to UBC she was a full Professor, Vice Chair for Academic Affairs, and Director of the Division of Preventive Medicine at Emory University School of Medicine in Atlanta, Georgia. She clinically specialized in cholesterol management at Emory's indigent health clinics and in their tertiary referral center from 1993 – 2004. During that time she also served as a Research Physician, Medical Epidemiologist, and Medical Consultant at the U.S. CDC, in Cancer Control, Health Care and Aging, Injury Control, Nutrition and Physical Activity, STD Prevention, and the Office on Smoking and Health.

She is an advocate for public health, most notably having served on the boards of the American College of Preventive Medicine (1997–2003) and Physicians for Social Responsibility (1998–2009, including serving as PSR's president from 2008 to 2009), and as an elected municipal official with special responsibilities for public health and sustainability for the University Neighbourhoods Association of the University of British Columbia (2007–2013). She has also served as a board member, executive committee member, and/or president of the American Journal of Preventive Medicine, American Medical Association (AMA) Council on Long Range Planning, AMA Section on Medical Schools’ Governing Council, Association of Teachers of Preventive Medicine Foundation, Center for Policy Analysis on Trade and Health, DuPont Epidemiology Advisory Board, DuPont Health Advisory Board, National Committee on Foreign Medical Education and Accreditation, UBC President's Commission on Sustainability, and the Ulrich and Ruth Frank Foundation for International Health. Frank was Research Director of the Annenberg Physician Training Program in Addiction Medicine (since 2005–2022), served as a senior medical scientist for the Occupational Health and Safety Agency for Healthcare of BC (2006–2007), and has travelled and/or worked in 70 countries. She founded the Ulrich and Ruth Frank Foundation for International Health in 1988 when she graduated from medical school (naming it for her parents, Ulrich and Ruth Frank, as a thank you to them for giving her an extraordinary education), and continuously served as its president until 2019.

In 2001, she founded NextGenU.org with a focus on the health sciences. In 2024, NextGenU.org launched the University Network, partnering with accredited academic institutions to offer free courses, certificates, and degrees spanning from first grade to PhD. Professor Frank has tested and published on this model globally.

Frank was the health reporter from 1985 to 1987 for the central Georgia ABC-TV affiliate, Editor of the student component of JAMA in 1987–88, the health reporter for Vogue in 1988–89, and Co-Editor in Chief of the scientific journal, Preventive Medicine from 1994 to 1999. She has also made multiple international television and radio appearances, written editorials, and been quoted in print as an expert on various prevention-related topics with Agence France-Presse, Associated Press, BBC, CBC, CNN, Later Today Show, National Press Club, The New York Times, Reuters, USA Today, The Vancouver Observer and others.

Frank also has worked as a green building designer, UBC School of Population and Public Health museum Founder/Director, social entrepreneur, and environmentalist. In sustainable design, she helped lead developing three of UBC's "Top 10 Campus Gems" (a skatepark, an outdoor classroom, and the display of the Bioenergy Research & Demonstration Facility), was co-designer and inhabitant of three cohousing communities, and had 12 years of co-designing, owning, and inhabiting the only energy independent home in Georgia. She is the Founder and was the Director of the Museum of Population and Public Health at UBC, was the Founder and President of PosterUp.org, and was the owner/SuperHost of the only non-profit AirBnb/VRBO home.

== Research ==
Frank has published over 170 peer-reviewed scientific publications, including four first-authored papers in JAMA and articles in other major peer-reviewed medical journals such as The Lancet, BMJ and Annals of Internal Medicine.

In addition to Frank's research on the efficacy of NextGenU.org to improve health, her other research has revealed how physicians’ (and medical students') personal and clinical prevention habits strongly and consistently influence their patients' habits. This work has led to her developing the Healthy Doc – Healthy Patient initiative, a series of studies and programs to improve physicians' prevention counseling by improving their personal health practices.

This research began in 1991 with Frank's conducting "The Women Physicians’ Health Study". WPHS demonstrated that physicians’ health practices strongly and consistently influence their patient care practices and that (contrary to myth) physicians have extremely healthy personal practices. Frank was also the Principal Investigator of a national study at 17 U.S. medical schools, showing that it is possible to cultivate personal health habits among medical students, and that these students are then more likely to counsel their patients about prevention. Frank has globally led the study and promotion of the relationship between physicians’ personal and clinical prevention habits, publishing >100 physician health articles, found here. This includes being Principal Investigator of multiple (>=2/country) national studies in Canada, Colombia, Israel, and the U.S., importantly establishing the strong, consistent "Healthy Doc = Healthy Patient" relationship (shown here with 1.9 million Israeli patients and their 1,488 physicians), and its predecessor, a 5-year, 17 U.S. medical school intervention study showing the positive effects of encouraging medical students’ healthy behaviors on their personal and clinical prevention habits.

== Personal life ==
Frank is the daughter of Ulrich Anton Frank, a prolific and renowned biomedical engineer, inventor, sculptor, and painter, and Ruth Esser Frank, Ed.D., a professor of education at Bucks County Community College, both refugees from Hitler's Germany. Frank was married to Dr. Randall White (from 1990 to 2015), the father of their son, Nathaniel Etheridge Frank-White ["Ridge"]. She was from 1999 until 2006 a resident of the Lake Claire cohousing community, and co-designed, built, and inhabited the only energy independent home in Georgia (1995–2006).

== Awards ==
Selected Awards

- First Recipient of the American College of Preventive Medicine's Rising Star (1996) and Gold Humanism in Medicine (2015) Awards, and recipient (2012) of ACPM's Distinguished Service Award
- Outstanding alumnus award, Emory School of Public Health (1998)
- Recipient, Alpha Omega Alpha (U.S. national medical honor society), 2005
- Faculty Emerging Leader in Global Health Innovation, Consortium of Universities for Global Health, 2015
- Nominated in 2016 to be Director General of the World Health Organization by the Canadian Medical Association and ACPM
