= Erica Buettner =

American singer-songwriter

- Born: July 12, 1984 (age 41)
- Origin: Connecticut, United States
- Genres: Folk
- Occupations: Singer-songwriter, musician
- Instruments: Vocals, guitar
- Label: Peppermoon Music
- Website: ericabuettner.bandcamp.com

Erica Buettner is an American indie folk singer songwriter based in New York City. Her deepest influences are to be found in the tradition of American folk musicians and singer songwriters such as Joan Baez, Bob Dylan, Joni Mitchell and Leonard Cohen. Erica Buettner composes and sings in English and plays the guitar, banjo, flute and kantele. Her debut album, "True Love and Water", was produced by Pierre Faa and released on April 4, 2011, in digital format by Peppermoon Music / Believe and in a limited cassette edition by Cakes and Tapes. The CD edition will be released in September 2011 by Peppermoon Music. Erica has played in several countries such as the United States, France, Belgium, Portugal, the UK, the Netherlands and Italy. Her music has been acclaimed by La Blogothèque and Les Inrocks.

== Biography ==
Erica Buettner is originally from Avon, Connecticut. She did not grow up in a musical family but started singing as a girl. She studied at the University of Connecticut, graduating Phi Beta Kappa as an English and French double major. During her undergraduate years she studied abroad in Paris, and loved the city so much that ended up staying for six years. Parisian songwriter and independent producer Pierre Faa once listened to her playing guitar at the Parc Montsouris in the 14th arrondissement and invited her to play and record in his studio in Montmartre, marking the beginning of her professional musical career. The result of this collaboration is her debut album, "True Love and Water", that features other Paris-based, French and Belgian musicians, such as Stefanos Kotsanis, Romain Garnier (Hastings, Rooftop), Boris Gronemberger (V.O., Raymondo, Soy Un Caballo, Françoiz Breut), Conrad Steel (Teeth), Jesse D. Vernon (Morningstar) and Pierre Faa (Peppermoon) himself. The cover artwork was made by English collage artist Martin O'Neill.

After an invitation from Coimbra's promoting agency Lugar Comum to play three concerts in Portugal in 2009, Erica Buettner fell in love with the country and eventually moved there. In an interview, she commented this decision with a Goethe's citation from his "Italian Journey": "(...) I am a voluntary exile, a wanderer by design, unwise with a purpose, everywhere a stranger and everywhere at home, letting my life run its course where it will, rather than trying to guide it, since, in any case, I don't know where it will lead me".

Despite composing in English, she has covered songs in French such as "C'est Julien" for the Dutch compilation "Filles Fragiles", originally performed by Marie Laforêt, and "L'Étincelle" by Stefanos Kotsanis.

Erica Buettner is also part of The Resident Cards, a joint project with Dana Boulé with collaborating musician Boris Gronemberger that will release a new album in 2012. She also sings with Liam Carey (Secondstar), The Sobs, My Broken Frame, V.O. and has played with Françoiz Breut. In 2011, Erica Buettner participated also in Pierre Faa's song "Kokoro Iyasu" in benefit of the victims of the earthquake in the Tohoku-Kanto region, East Japan.

== Discography ==
Year	Album	Label
2011	True Love and Water	Peppermoon music
2018	The Book of Waves	self-released
