= Erica Prugger =

Italian luger

Personal information
- Nationality: Italian
- Born: 22 June 1945 (age 81) Urtijëi, Italy

Sport
- Sport: Luge

Erica Prugger (born 22 June 1945) is an Italian luger. She competed at the 1964 Winter Olympics and the 1968 Winter Olympics.
