= Erica Mindel =

American-Israeli manager

Erica Mindel is an American-Israeli Jewish former IDF soldier, currently serving as Public Policy Manager of Hate Speech at TikTok since July 2025.

== Early life and education ==
Mindel received her Bachelor of Arts in political science from the University of Michigan in 2016, and her Master of Public Policy from Johns Hopkins University in 2023.

At the University of Michigan, she participated in pro-Israel advocacy and published an op-ed on the tension between free speech and safety.

In 2023, Mindel received the Seidman Award for Outstanding Capstone in Public Management for her capstone proposing new legislation forcing social media sites to follow their own terms of use agreements.

== Career ==
After graduation from the University of Michigan, Mindel moved to Israel and served as an instructor within the Israel Defense Forces (IDF) Armored Corps for two years.

Mindel served under Deborah Lipstadt as a staff member of the Special Envoy to Monitor and Combat Antisemitism (SEAS) at the US State Department in the Biden Administration from 2022 to 2025.

Mindel's appointment at TikTok attracted criticism given her ties to the IDF. Her hiring came amidst criticism that TikTok failed to address antisemitism on the platform in the aftermath of the October 7 attacks and genocide in Gaza.
