= Erica Bree Rosenblum =

American biologist

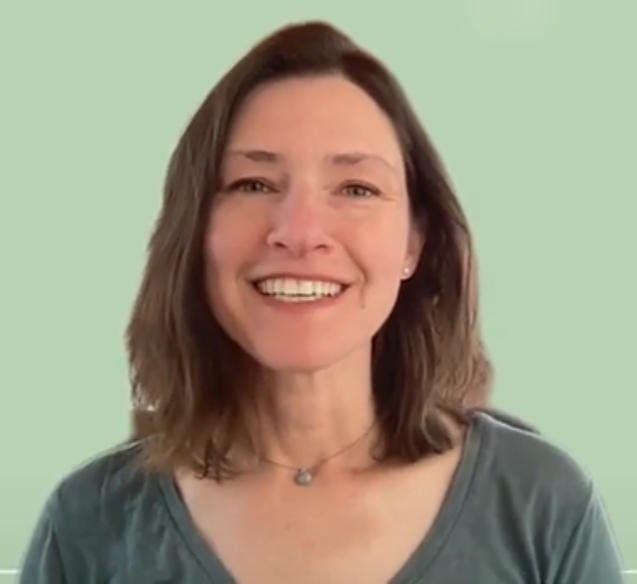
- Education: Brown University (B.S.); University of California Berkeley (Ph.D.)
- Scientific career
- Fields: Evolutionary Ecology, Herpetology
- Workplaces: University of California Berkeley
- Website: nature.berkeley.edu/rosenblum/

Erica Bree Rosenblum is an American herpetologist and evolutionary biologist. She is a Professor of Global Change Biology in the department of Environmental Science, Policy, and Management at the University of California Berkeley. She is also the director of Berkeley Connect, a mentorship program for undergraduate students. Rosenblum's main research areas include a fungus that causes high mortality rates in frogs and evolution in lizards in White Sands, New Mexico.

== Education ==
Erica Bree Rosenblum is originally from Brooklyn, New York. She received her bachelor's degree with honors from Brown University in ecology and evolutionary biology in 1996. In 2005, Rosenblum graduated with her Ph.D. in Integrative Biology from University of California Berkeley.

== Research ==
Erica Bree Rosenblum has published over 100 papers and has received over 3500 citations in total. She is known for her research on the fungus Batrachochytrium dendrobatidis that has caused high mortality rates and near extinction in some frog species. She is also known for her work in the evolution and speciation of lizards in White Sands, New Mexico. Rosenblum is often recognized for her effort to cause as little impact on the species she is researching as possible.

== Awards and honors ==
- 2011 Awarded NSF CAREER grant
