= Experiment on Rapidly Intensifying Cyclones over the Atlantic =

The Experiment on Rapidly Intensifying Cyclones over the Atlantic, or ERICA, is a scientific project that spanned a period of 1986–1991, with a field study in the winter of 1988/1989. The program was funded by the Office of Naval Research. Its aims were to better understand the processes involved in rapid cyclogenesis, and so improve understanding and forecasting of the situations that cause it by incorporating study findings into weather models.

The ERICA program used several methods, such as buoys and aircraft, to measure data in rapidly intensifying extratropical cyclones, selected with a criterion of at least 10 millibars of deepening over 6 hours.

== See also ==
- RAINEX
