= Erica Plambeck =

American operations researcher

Erica L. Plambeck is an American operations researcher specializing in supply chain management and environmental sustainability. She is Charles A. Holloway Professor of Operations, Information & Technology in the Stanford Graduate School of Business, professor in the Stanford University Department of Civil & Environmental Engineering, senior fellow in the Stanford Woods Institute for the Environment, and the 2022–2023 Dhirubhai Ambani Faculty Fellow in Entrepreneurship at Stanford University.

== Education and career ==
Plambeck majored in industrial engineering and mathematics at the University of Wisconsin–Madison, graduating in 1994. After traveling to England as a Marshall Scholar and earning a master's degree in management studies at the University of Cambridge and a diploma in economics at the London School of Economics, she returned to the US for doctoral study in engineering economic systems and operations research at Stanford University, where she completed her Ph.D. in 2000. Her dissertation, Dynamic Incentive Problems in Operations Management, was jointly supervised by Stefanos Zenios and Stephen M. Robinson.

She became an assistant professor in the Stanford Graduate School of Business in 2000, affiliated with its program in Operations, Information & Technology. There, she became a full professor in 2005, was named Walter Kenneth Kilpatrick Professor in 2010, and was named Charles A. Holloway Professor in 2015. She also holds an affiliation as professor in Stanford's Department of Civil & Environmental Engineering, part of both the Stanford University School of Engineering and Stanford Doerr School of Sustainability.

== Recognition ==
Plambeck was a 2003 recipient of the Presidential Early Career Award for Scientists and Engineers, "for applying innovative approaches to optimize real-time information for industrial issues such as movement in the supply chain, and dynamic control of pricing and production". The Aspen Institute gave Plambeck a Faculty Pioneer Award in 2005.
