= Erika Heucke =

German volleyball player (born 1942)

Personal information
- Nationality: German
- Born: 20 November 1942 (age 82); Dassel, Germany

Sport
- Sport: Volleyball

Erika Heucke (born 20 November 1942) is a German former volleyball player. She competed in the women's tournament at the 1972 Summer Olympics.
