= Erica Eloff =

- Occupation: Soprano
- Website: www.ericaeloff.com

Erica Eloff is a South African born, French soprano specializing in opera, lieder and oratorio, currently residing in Linz, Austria. She made her professional debut in the UK during the summer of 2008 at Garsington Opera as Fiordiligi in Mozart's Così fan tutte. She also made her Wigmore Hall debut in their 2008/09 season with the pianist James Baillieu as a Kirckman Concert Society Artist and made a critically acclaimed return in their 2009/10 season.

Eloff graduated from the North-West University, Potchefstroom, where she earned multiple prizes and scholarships. She also won numerous singing prizes including the London Handel Singing Competition (2008), the UNISA National Singing Competition (2005), the UFAM Concours Internationaux de Chant, degré Honneur (2003) in France, and the Singing Category and Overall winner of ATKV Forté (2000) (renamed ATKV Muziq). In the UK she was also selected by Making Music as a Philip and Dorothy Green Young Concert Artist. Eloff has been featured on BBC Radio 3's In Tune and interviewed by Bob Jones for Classic FM.

Eloff works extensively as oratorio singer and recitalist in the UK, Germany, Belgium and South Africa and has also performed for various smaller opera companies in the UK. Her performance credits include Belinda in Purcell's Dido and Aeneas, The Queen of the Night and First Lady in Mozart's Zauberflöte, Floria Tosca in Puccini's Tosca and Violetta Valéry in Verdi's La Traviata. She also understudied the title role in Beethoven's Fidelio for Garsington Opera.

== Discography ==
- Somerkersfees - Christmas compilation with Singkronies Chamber Choir, 2000
- Songs – Lieder by Grieg, Wolf, Rachmaninov, Wilding and de Villiers, 2010
