= European Maritime Safety Agency =

Agency of the European Union

- Logo

- Flag

Agency overview
- Formed: 25 August 2002
- Jurisdiction: European Union
- Headquarters: Lisbon, Portugal; 38.70564°N 9.14216°W
- Agency executive: Maja Markovčić Kostelac, Director
- Key document: Regulation (EC) No 1406/2002
- Website: emsa.europa.eu

Map
- European Maritime Safety Agency (European Union)

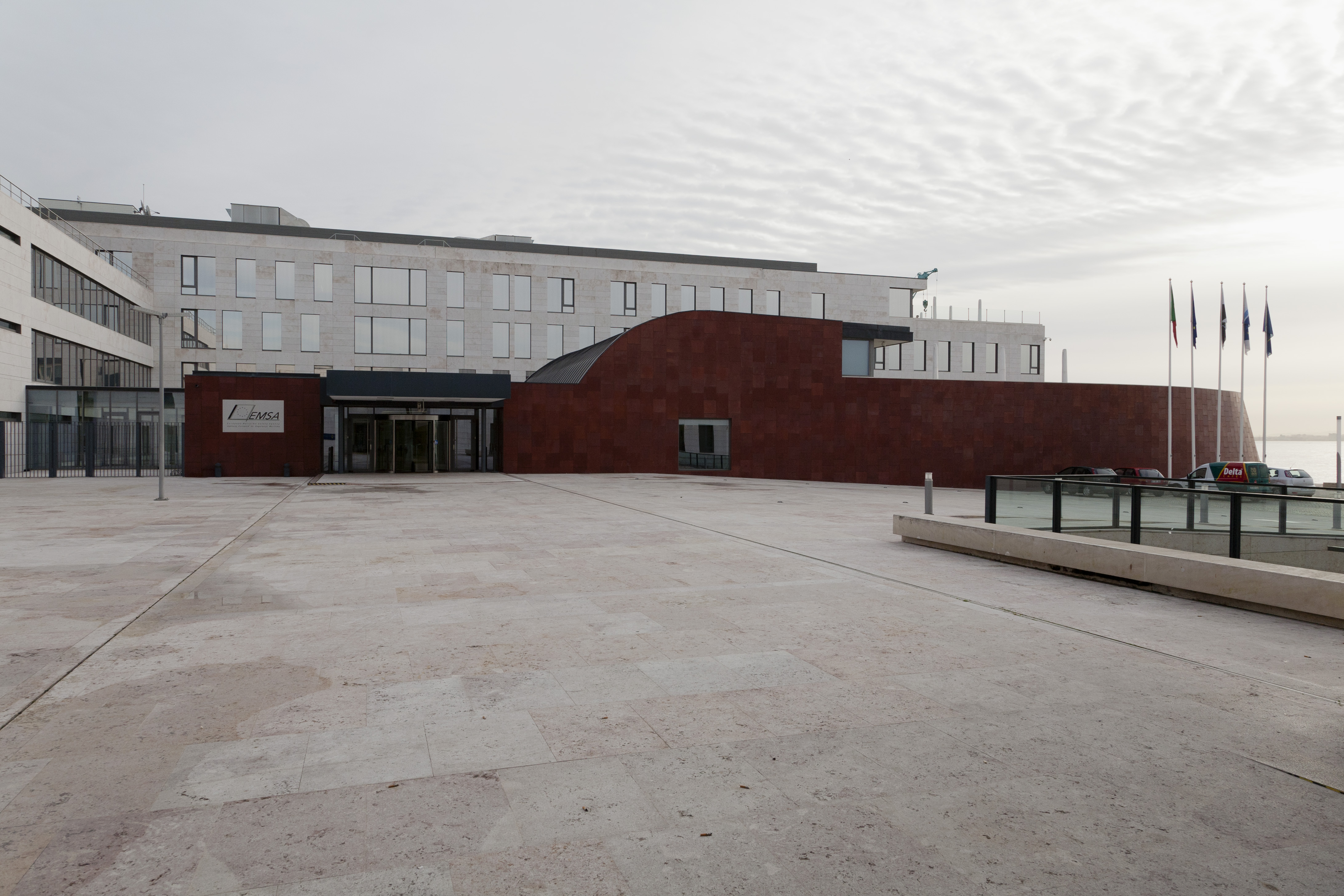
New building in Lisbon

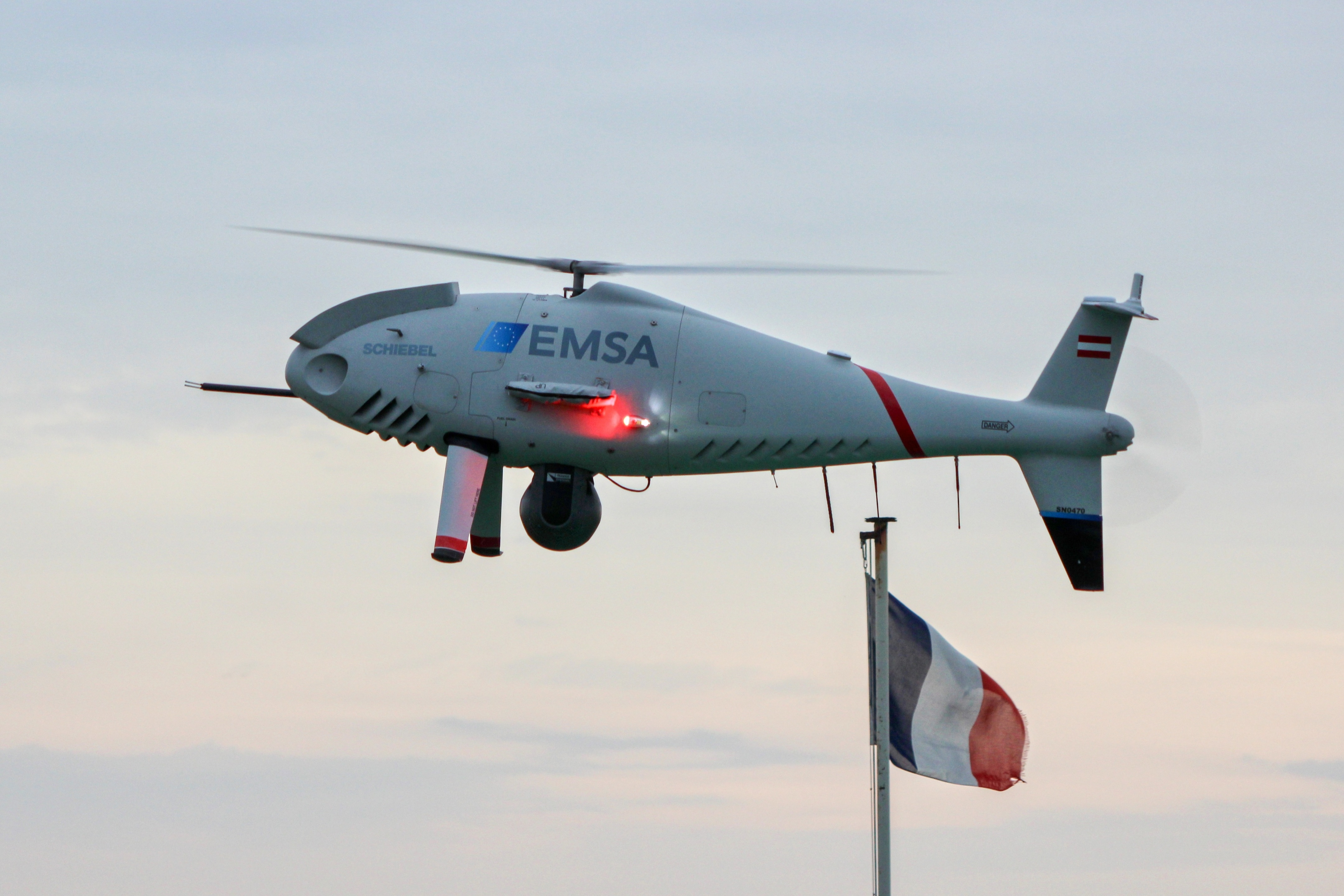
Schiebel Camcopter S-100 unmanned helicopter used by EMSA for pollution monitoring

The European Maritime Safety Agency (EMSA) is a European Union agency charged with reducing the risk of maritime accidents, marine pollution from ships and the loss of human lives at sea by helping to enforce the pertinent EU legislation. It is headquartered in Lisbon.

== Mission ==
EMSA has the following mission:

- assist the Commission in preparing EU legislation in the field of maritime safety and prevention of pollution by ships
- assist the Commission in the effective implementation of EU legislation on maritime safety and maritime security, in particular by monitoring the overall functioning of the EU port State control regime,
- organise training activities, develop technical solutions and provide technical assistance related to the implementation of EU legislation
- help develop a common methodology for investigating maritime accidents
- provide data on maritime safety and on pollution by ships and help improve the identification and pursuit of ships making unlawful discharges

In doing so, EMSA closely cooperates with the Member States' maritime services.

== History and structure ==
EMSA was founded in 2002, after the EU adopted substantial packages of legislation relating to maritime security in the wake of major shipping disasters in European waters, such as those involving the ferry Estonia and the oil tankers Erika and Prestige. It was felt that a specialised technical agency was necessary to overview the enforcement of this legislation and help in its implementation.

EMSA is headquartered in Lisbon, Portugal, and moved in June 2009 to new, purpose-built premises near Cais do Sodré in central Lisbon. It has a staff of just under 200 and operates a small network (at the end of 2009, 16 vessels) of stand-by oil recovery vessels contracted from the commercial sector, designed to provide top-up capacity to Member States' own response resources. Its executive director, since 1 January 2019, is Maja Markovčić Kostelac from Croatia. The 2008 budget for EMSA was just over EUR 50,000,000, of which over a third, EUR 18,000,000 is specifically used for at sea pollution response tasks.

== See also ==
- CleanSeaNet
