= Erica Rose =

Erica Rose may refer to:

- Erica Rose (television personality) (born 1983), American lawyer and reality TV personality
- Erica Rose (swimmer) (born 1982), American competition swimmer
