= Erica Deeman =

British visual artist

- Born: 1977 (age 48–49); Nottingham, UK
- Education: University of California, Berkeley (MFA, 2022)
- Occupation: Visual artist

Erica Deeman (born 1977 in Nottingham, UK) is a British visual artist of Jamaica descent considering the liminal and transitory spaces in which Black identities are formed. Deeman’s work is interdisciplinary in nature, and she creates in both physical and virtual spaces. She lives and works between San Francisco, California, and Seattle, Washington.

== Works ==
=== Silhouettes ===
Deeman's first body of work Silhouettes appeared at Pier 24 Photography and Berkeley Art Museum Pacific Film Archive in 2017. The series consists of thirty images of women from the African Diaspora whom she invited into her studio whilst she was a student at the Academy of Art in San Francisco. Deeman created this work as a means to build community as a new immigrant within the United States. She considers the Black femme form and the gaze of Western art, subverting notions of beauty only granted historically to a select few. The works speak to the role and legacy of portraiture and what is seen and unseen in these depictions. Within this setting she considers her own identity. The photographs are printed at 45 inches x 45 inches rendering each collaborator at scale and impact.

=== The Brown Series ===
In her second body of work, Deeman collaborated with men from the African Diaspora set against a brown background close to the artists own skin color. Deeman again created a network and community with this body of work, inviting strangers, friends and acquaintances into her living room to make the images. Deeman sees the work as challenging the archive of violence in photography, creating tender and delicate portraits. Thirty portraits are currently on display in Looking Forward, Looking Back at Pier 24 Photography.

=== Familiar Stranger ===
Deeman turned the lens on herself for the first time in 2019 while in residence at Headlands Center for the Arts. Continuing to use an analog approach to portraiture, Deeman used the black-and-white images she created of herself and translated them into 3D printed molds and then, finally, imprinted them in Cassius Obsidian clay. She wanted to consider and expand on what the photography could be. Deeman is inspired by the writings of cultural theorist Stuart Hall, and titled the work after his posthumously published autobiography. Hall’s theories of becoming resonated with her especially his connection to Jamaica and the United Kingdom a mirror of her own cultural identity. During this time Deeman was also working on images for the 1619 Project which deeply influenced her to consider what is left behind to be remembered by.

== Exhibitions ==
- Old Truman Brewery, London, UK
- Pier 24 Photography, San Francisco, California
- Berkeley Art Museum, Berkeley, California
- New Orleans Museum of Art, New Orleans, Louisiana

== Permanent collections ==
- Berkeley Art Museum and Pacific Film Archive, Berkeley, California
- Museum of Contemporary Photography, Chicago, Illinois
- Museum of Photographic Arts, San Diego, California
- New Orleans Museum of Art, New Orleans, Louisiana
- Pérez Art Museum Miami, Miami, Florida
- Pier 24 Photography, San Francisco, California

== Education ==
- 2000: Leeds Beckett University, Leeds, UK: BA (Hons) Public Relations.
- 2014: Academy of Art, San Francisco, California: BFA Photography.
- 2022: University of California, Berkeley, Berkeley, California: MFA Art Practice
