= Ericka Portilla =

Chilean politician

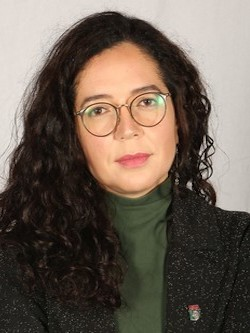

Member of the Constitutional Convention
- In office 4 July 2021 – 4 July 2022
- Constituency: 4th District

Personal details
- Born: 4 January 1985 (age 41) Potrerillos, Chile
- Party: Communist Party
- Education: University of Atacama (LL.B)
- Occupation: Constituent
- Profession: Lawyer

Ericka Portilla Barrios (born 4 January 1985) is a Chilean lawyer and politician.

A member of the Communist Party of Chile, she was elected as a member of the Constitutional Convention in 2021, representing the 4th District of the Atacama Region.

She previously served as Provincial Governor of Copiapó between 2016 and 2018 and coordinated the Convention’s Thematic Committee on Constitutional Principles, Democracy, Nationality, and Citizenship.

== Biography ==
Portilla was born in Potrerillos on 4 January 1985. She is the daughter of Claudio Eleno Portilla Olivares and Marisol Gladys del Carmen Barrios García. She is unmarried.

Portilla completed her secondary education at the Escuela Técnico Profesional of Copiapó, graduating in 2002. She later studied law at the University of Atacama, qualifying as a lawyer, and obtained a master’s degree in law from the University of Chile.

She has worked as a lecturer in Civil Law I and Human Rights at the Central University of Chile (La Serena campus), as an internal audit officer at the University of Atacama, and as a teaching assistant in the Department of Private Law at the Faculty of Legal and Social Sciences of the Central University. She has also practiced law independently.

== Political career ==
Portilla is a member of the Communist Party of Chile and was previously active as a student leader. Between 2014 and 2016, she served as Regional Secretary (Seremi) of Transport and Telecommunications for the Atacama Region.

From 18 November 2016 to 11 March 2018, she served as Provincial Governor of Copiapó.

In the elections held on 15–16 May 2021, Portilla ran as a candidate for the Constitutional Convention representing the 4th District of the Atacama Region, as part of the Apruebo Dignidad electoral pact for the Communist Party of Chile. She obtained 10,141 votes, corresponding to 12.32% of the valid votes cast, and was elected as a member of the Convention.

During the Convention’s proceedings, she served as coordinator of the Thematic Committee on Constitutional Principles, Democracy, Nationality, and Citizenship.
