= Erica Green =

Erica Green may refer to:

- Erica Green (cyclist) (born 1970), South African female cyclist
- Erica L. Green (journalist), award-winning African American journalist
- Murder of Erica Green, a three-year-old American murder victim
