= Érika Sâmia =

Brazilian footballer (born 1996)

Personal information
- Full name: Érika Sâmia Lima da Silva
- Date of birth: 27 November 1996 (age 29)
- Position: Full-back

Érika Sâmia Lima da Silva (born November 27, 1996) is a Brazilian former footballer who as a full-back played for Deportivo de La Coruña in Liga F. Da Silva had previously played for Oviedo Moderno.
