= CleanSeaNet =

CleanSeaNet (CSN) is a satellite-based monitoring system for marine oil spill detection and surveillance in European waters.

CSN was created by the European Maritime Safety Agency (EMSA) in 2007 to include services such as locating and following oil pollution, monitoring accidental or deliberate pollution, and identifying polluters through the use of synthetic aperture radar (SAR) satellite images. The information given from these images includes spill location, spill area and length, and source of the spill.

As of 2017, CSN has become available in, “23 European Union (EU) coastal member states, two EFTA coastal states, three EU candidate countries, the Dutch Caribbean, the French Antilles, Greenland and finally the European neighbourhood partner countries across the Mediterranean, Black and Caspian seas.”

The legal basis for the CSN service is Directive 2005/35/EC on ship-source pollution and on the introduction of penalties, including criminal penalties, for pollution offenses (as amended by Directive 2009/123/EC). The EMSA has been tasked to 'work with the member states in developing technical solutions and providing technical assistance in relation to the implementation of this directive, in actions such as tracing discharges by satellite monitoring and surveillance'.

== History ==
=== Prelude ===
Monitoring European waters is particularly challenging being that the EU is an inundated peninsula with extensive external coastlines and several significant semi-enclosed seas.

Prior to the establishment of CSN, there were around 1400 satellite images taken per year used by 12 EU countries. These images were either bought from satellite providers or service providers under national contractors or were provided by the European Space Agency led MarCoast project.

During this time, countries found the number of images to be insufficient in order to efficiently locate and deal with accidental or deliberate pollution caused by marine vessels.

Crewed aircraft were also frequently used for surveillance purposes on a small scale; however, it would be costly and inefficient to use them for comprehensive coverage of European waters.

Two oil spills in particular caused by the tanker ships Erika and Prestige played influential roles in the need for a more efficient locating method due to the harsh environmental consequences they created.

In December 1999, the tanker Erika departed from Dunkerque carrying 31,000 tons of heavy fuel oil. While crossing the Bay of Biscay in heavy weather, the tanker experienced structural damages resulting in the tanker breaking into two. Its fuel load was expelled into the surrounding French waters leaving serious environmental damage. When exposed to water for a period of time, the oil creates a water-in-oil emulsion causing an increase in volume and viscosity. During the cleanup process, between 190,000 and 200,000 tonnes of oil waste was collected from the surrounding 400 kilometers of shoreline. Because it left almost 42,000 birds dead, the spill caused by Erika was named the largest ecological disaster for Europe's seabirds.

In November 2002, the tanker Prestige departed from Ventspils, Latvia carrying 77,000 tons of two different grades of heavy fuel oil. Due to harsh weather conditions, the tanker took in water, resulting in a 50-foot hole in the side of the ship. French, Spanish, and Portuguese governments refused entry into their ports fearing pollution to their waters, resulting in the ship floating adrift for several days before it sank in Portuguese waters. In total, 20 million US gallons were expelled from the tanker leading to harsh environmental impacts. The consequences include 22,000 dead birds and a total loss of 296.96 million dollars to the Spanish fishing sector between the years 2002 and 2006. The Prestige oil spill remains Spain and Portugal's worst ecological disaster to this day.

=== Formation ===
In September 2005, the European Parliament and the Council adopted Directive 2005/35/EC (since amended by Directive 2009/123/EC) in response to pollution caused by marine vessels. This directive established penalties including criminal offenses, for the improper dumping of wastes by ships.

The directive tasked the EMSA to work with its member states to create technical solutions and provide technical assistance in order to implement the directive.

In April 2007, the EMSA established an oil slick detection service using SAR satellite images in order to efficiently track and monitor oil spills in EU waters. This service would be available to all member states as well as authorities in all EU and EFTA states.

== CleanSeaNet satellites ==
CSN uses images from a number of satellites in order to alert member states of potential oil spills.

CSN offers near-real-time (NRT) full resolution images of a 400 kilometer stretch of water in up to 30 minutes. Near real-time refers to the delivery time of images from the satellites to the operators. An additional 200 kilometers are added to the images every five minutes after the initial thirty. The max length that can be obtained by these images is 1400 kilometers.

CSN is able to achieve this through the use of SAR satellite images. The satellites use radar signals that are able to map a body of water based on the amount of disturbance on the surface from waves and ripples created by ocean winds. When the oil is present on the water's surface, it creates a glassy area free of ripples. SAR satellites send radar signals that bounce off the water's surface measuring the amount of disturbance. Because oil creates less disturbance while present on the water's surface, it appears darker than the surrounding area that is not exposed. This allows the satellites to map and locate an accumulation of oil.

Not only are these satellites able to map oil slicks, but they are used for locating and identifying vessels. While oil slicks appear darker on the image, ships and other vessels appear a lighter color. Through the use of SeaSafeNet, the vessel can be identified almost immediately.

CSN currently has three satellites in use which are ENVISAT, RADARSAT1, and RADARSAT 2. Through the use of these SAR satellites, CSN has been able to increase the number of images to 2100 per year.

== Protocol ==
CSN allows member states access to the images produced by SAR Satellites. These images, “either address sea areas not already covered, or which provide enhanced coverage for sea areas already under surveillance.”

A network of receiving stations in Norway, Italy, and Azores download the satellite data and send it to control centers for processing and analysis by operators. Using precise methods, the trained operators are able to evaluate whether or not an area is being affected by an unprecedented pollution event. If detected, the information is sent to the affected member state(s) as well as to the EMSA. Coastal authorities are then sent to evaluate the scene and report back to the EMSA.

If a large-scale pollution event is found, the national operational response mechanism is enacted. During this response, there is an alert level system used to judge the nature of the incident.

The alert level is based on three distinct factors: likelihood, culprit, and impact. Likelihood refers to the confidence that the spill that occurred was oil. The next refers to how likely a culprit can be identified. Some of the factors used to measure this category include whether the possible culprit's vessel track matches that of the spill's shape, traffic density, whether a possible polluter has already been identified, and a culprit's distance from the spill. The last factor is impact, which is measured by surface area, distance to sensitive areas, and distance to the shoreline.

Using these three factors, the EMSA can construct an Alert Matrix in order to describe the severity of the incident. Using an Alert Matrix, the EMSA identifies the severity using the colors red, yellow, and green. Green being low risk and red being high risk.

== Examples of CleanSeaNet uses ==
In 2016, a CSN alert report was sent to authorities in the Netherlands and Germany concerning a possible spill. Because the spill area was split into both countries, both parties received alerts from CSN. Netherland officials flew over the area during the times that they were expecting services from CNS and were able to capture footage of the culprit while they were dumping palm oil off the vessel. When questioned by Netherland authorities, the captain proceeded to say that their actions did not break any guidelines. Netherland officials notified German officials, and upon further investigation of the vessel, it was found that the actions did in fact not follow guidelines resulting in a fine.

In April 2015, the Oleg Naydenov sank 15 miles off the coast of Spain. The vessel was carrying “1,409 tonnes of fuel, 30 tonnes of gasoil and 65 tonnes of luboil.” Directly following the incident, Spain received 13 images from CSN that allowed officials to more efficiently organize their relief efforts.

In August 2011, 176 kilometers off the coast of Scotland, the Gannet F oil platform suffered an accident resulting in an oil spill. During the leak, the platform released 200 metric tonnes of oil into the surrounding body of water. Even days following the event, relief efforts still remained unsuccessful. Six days later, the UK's Maritime and Coastguard Agency requested satellite support from the EMSA. Nine high-resolution radar images and eight high-resolution optical images were sent on the same day of the request. Five days later on August 21, the leak had been contained, and monitoring had been shut down only three days after this.

In February 2010, two vessels collided entering the port of Genoa, 1.5 kilometers off the coast of northwest Italy. The tugboat called Francia collided into the CMA CGM Strauss, which was a container ship holding fuel oil. This resulted in a spillage of 184 tonnes into the area surrounding the port. French authorities requested assistance from CSN and received six satellite images within 30 hours to keep track of the oil slick that spanned between Genoa and Toulon. The spill was managed over the span of 10 days.

== See also ==
- Environmental protection
