= Erica Ericsson =

Swedish football midfielder

Personal information
- Full name: Erica Ericsson
- Date of birth: 23 June 1990 (age 36)
- Place of birth: Sweden
- Position: Midfielder

Team information
- Current team: QBIK

Senior career*
Years	Team	Apps	(Gls)
2011–2014	QBIK	80	(1)
2015	Mallbackens IF	16	(0)
2016–	QBIK	4	(0)
- * Club domestic league appearances and goals as of 23:07, 22 May 2016 (UTC)

Erica Ericsson (born 23 June 1990) is a Swedish football midfielder who plays for QBIK.
