= Erica Baneth =

Australian sculptor (born 1928)

Erica Marianna Baneth, née Foti, (1928– ) by 1968 known as Erica Baneth-Goodey, was an Australian sculptor, born in Budapest, Hungary.

== History ==
Baneth was born in Budapest, Hungary, and emigrated to Australia in 1948.

By 1964 she was teaching at Mount Scopus Memorial College of Burwood, Victoria.

She studied at Royal Melbourne Institute of Technology 1955–1959, Canberra Institute of Technology 1959–1962, National Gallery of Victoria (part time) 1963, Hammersmith School of Architecture and Arts 1966.

She taught at Monash University University in 1968, and around this time became known as Baneth-Goodey.

She married in 1977 and emigrated to Los Angeles.
