= Erica Glasper =

American behavioral neuroscientist

- Born: Norfolk, Virginia, U.S.
- Children: 2

Academic background
- Education: Randolph–Macon College (BA); Ohio State University (MA, PhD)

Academic work
- Discipline: Neuroscience
- Sub-discipline: Behavioral neuroscience
- Institutions: Princeton University; University of Maryland, College Park; Ohio State University

Erica Glasper is an American behavioral neuroscientist. Her laboratory observed the first alterations in hippocampal dendritic morphology and behavioral function induced by social bonding and fatherhood in California mice (Peromyscus californicus).

== Early life and education ==
Glasper completed her primary education in the Norfolk Public Schools in Norfolk, Virginia. She participated in the gifted and talented program at her elementary school from first through fifth grade. In high school, she joined the Magnet School for Health and Science Professions, which was housed at Eastern Virginia Medical School. She also began to competitively sing at this time and was a member of three ensembles during college.

Glasper received her Bachelor of Arts degree in psychology from Randolph–Macon College in Ashland, Virginia. She pursued a Master of Arts degree in psychology from the Ohio State University and later received her Doctor of Philosophy degree in psychobiology and behavioral neuroscience. She completed five years of postdoctoral training at Princeton University.

== Career ==
Glasper started performing research as an undergraduate student. She previously investigated the biology of nurturing in rodents with Kelly Lambert at Randolph-Macon College.

In 2004, while completing her doctoral degree, she worked with Courtney DeVries and Brian Pendergast to investigate the effect of social contact on animal wound healing. Their results demonstrated that stressed hamsters showed accelerated healing of skin wounds when paired with a sibling. Alternatively, in another study, they found that non-monogamous male deer mice who mated with multiple females during a breeding season did not show a difference in wound healing rate compared to when they were alone. Further work published in the European Journal of Neuroscience showed that mice with a history of cardiac arrest were hindered in learning a new spatial task compared to healthy mice. This was reflected structurally as an 18% decrease in hippocampal dendritic spine density in cardiac arrest mice compared to controls. While collaborating with Elizabeth Gould in July 2010, Glasper and fellow postdoctoral student Benedetta Leuner found that sexually active rodents were less anxious than rats without sexual experience and showed a comparative increase in hippocampal neurons.

Glasper joined the faculty and started her laboratory at the University of Maryland, College Park in the fall of 2011. Her current work focuses on natural behavior of animals in the wild, ranging from parenting to mating habits, and its influence on brain development. Her team made breakthroughs in using the California deermouse as a model to study parental experience-induced alterations in adult hippocampal neurogenesis and behavioral functioning. Glasper Lab joined the Institute for Behavioral Medicine Research at the Ohio State University Wexner Medical Center in September 2021.

Outside of research, Glasper has been involved in a number of academic committees with faculty at the University of Maryland. She was the co-chair of the Department of Psychology's Diversity Committee for a number of years. As of March 2021, she was the director of admissions and an associate chair of the Graduate Program in Neuroscience and Cognitive Science. She was elected to the board of trustees at Randolph–Macon College in April 2021.

== Honors and awards ==
Glasper participated in the Neuroscience Scholars Travel Fellowship, sponsored by the Society for Neuroscience, from 2005 to 2006. She was awarded the Young Investigator Award from the Society for Behavioral Neuroendocrinology in 2010, while she was at Princeton University. She was one of 334 young scientists selected to participate in the Kavli Frontiers of Science Symposia of the National Academy of Sciences in November 2016. In December 2020, she was recognized as one of 1000 inspiring black scientists in America by Cell Mentor.

== Personal life ==
Glasper married her husband in 2013 and has two children (Avery and Teigan).
