= Erica iJi =

- Born: Erica Iji; Plymouth, Devon, England
- Genres: R&B, pop, soul
- Occupations: Singer, songwriter
- Years active: 2005–present
- Website: ericaijimusic.com

Erica iJi aka EJ is a British singer-songwriter. She was born in Plymouth to an English mother and Nigerian father. She now lives in London. Her notable works include the track 'It's Over' which featured on Ministry of Sound's popular Bassline compilation "The sound of Bassline 2".

Her vocals have also featured on the album Scratch Came Scratch Saw Scratch Conquered by the pioneering dub and reggae producer Lee "Scratch" Perry. Released in 2008, SCSSSC went to number 8 in the Billboard World Music airplay chart in the US. The track "Heavy Voodoo" also featured Keith Richards on guitar.

== Musical career ==
To date Iji has released one studio album and two EPs. Her first album made in 2006 was entitled I AmErica. The debut was made with production company 'State of Emergency'. Iji worked with producer Steve Marshall who has also produced three albums with Lee 'Scratch' Perry. Her RNB track "Gotta Be Love" taken from the EP EJ was first played on BBC radio 1xtra in 2013 on the CJ Beatz show, where she was noted as one of the brightest talents to watch for from the South Coast.

Iji was listed on the musical line up in May 2014 for 'City Showcase' festival at Soho Flea market in London; previous performers at the Soho flea market include Amy Winehouse.

== Features and collaborations ==
In 2008, her vocals featured on the track "Heavy Voodoo" from the album Scratch Came, Scratch Saw, Scratch Conquered by 'Lee "Scratch" Perry. Keith Richards played guitar for the track.

In 2009, Iji featured on Ministry of Sounds compilation CD The Sound of Bassline 2. The track "It's Over" was a collaboration with 'DJ Matchstick' and was remixed by producer 'Wittyboy'.

Erica has collaborated with several other artists including SN1's collective 'Joe Grind' who is the brother of British rapper Giggs. Iji featured on Grind's mix tape entitled "Give to Gain" in 2011 and appeared in the video for "unconditional love" which she sang the chorus for.
