= Erica Scourti =

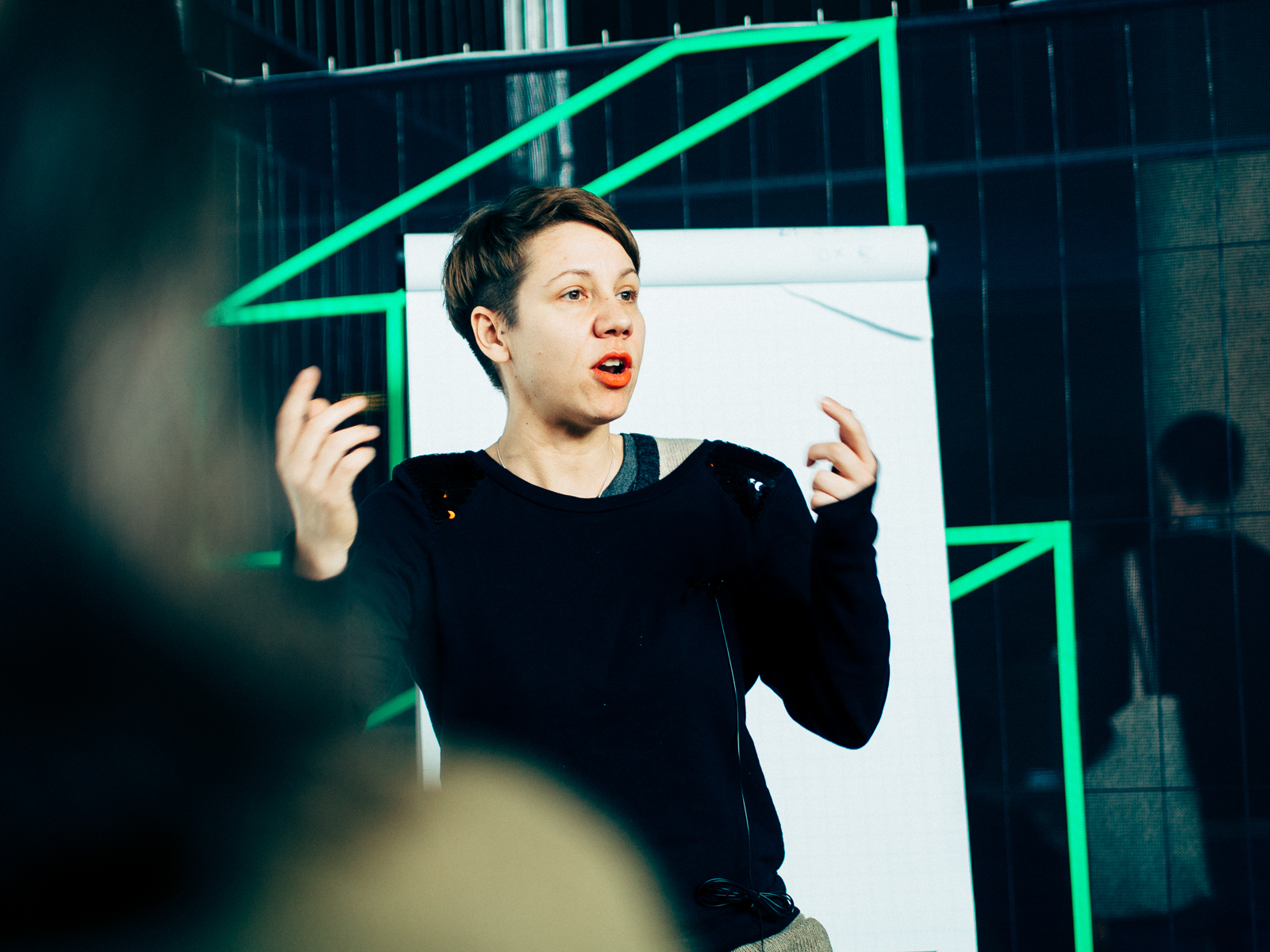
Erica Scourti at Transmediale festival in Berlin, 2015

Erica Scourti (they/them) (born in Athens) is an artist based in the UK whose works (which combine performance, digital media, the web, and video) have been exhibited at the Brighton Photo Biennial, the Hayward Gallery Project Space, and the Photographers' Gallery in London Their performance project, Life In Adwords (2012), involved them keeping a diary by email to their Google account and creating videos based on the advertising targeted to her as a result.

== Biography ==
Erica Scourti (born 1980) is a British-Greek artist, is a well-known modern artist whose work appears in performance, video, literature, and digital media. They frequently look at issues of identity, technology, and the modern individual. In the context of internet culture, Scourti's work often blurs the lines between the public and private domains through elements of self-exposure and self-reflection. Scourti's critical engagement with digital platforms and the ways in which they influence our perspectives of others and ourselves characterizes her artistic production. Scourti's artwork has been shown in galleries, museums, and festivals around the world.

== Education ==
In 2013, Scourti completed a Master of Research degree (with Distinction) in Moving Image Art at Central Saint Martin's College of Art & Design. Scourti is currently completing a PhD in art at Goldsmiths.

== Artworks ==
Erica Scourti often creates interdisciplinary work combining digital media, literature, film, and performance. Erica Scourti's work explores topics of identity, technology, and the self in the digital era. They draw on their strong foundation in artistic practice and critical inquiry, which they acquired via their school.

=== "Life in AdWords" (2013) ===
"Life in AdWords" is among Erica Scourti's most significant pieces. In this project, Scourti uses their personal information from Google's AdWords advertising platform to investigate topics of identity, privacy, and surveillance in the digital era. Scourti's study entails recording her impressions on AdWords, Google's advertising platform that shows customized ads according to users' online activity and interests. Scourti gathers and examines the advertisements that show up when they perform different web searches for terms and phrases as part of their investigation into AdWords. By recording the advertisements that AdWords produced in response to her online behavior, Scourti draws attention to the gathering, handling, and application of personal data for the purpose of targeted advertising. Scourti brings up concerns regarding digital privacy, the monetization of personal data, and the algorithms and systems that influence our online experiences.

"Spill Sections" (2016)

"Spill Sections" is a 2016 multimedia installation designed by Erica Scourti. Scourti examines identity fluidity, the intricacies of internet communication, and self-representation in this body of work. In the course of the project, Scourti interacts with numerous online platforms, including social media, chat rooms, and live streaming, through a number of performances, installations, and digital works. They move across these virtual environments, chatting with people and investigating various facets of their identity in real time. "Spill Sections" explores how people create and display themselves in digital spaces as well as the fractured character of online communication. Scourti's examination of these subjects highlights issues with intimacy, authenticity, and identity performance in the era of social media and digital technology.

"Empathy Deck" (2016)

In 2016, the "empathizing deck" was created. It consists of a deck of cards meant to encourage introspection and dialogue around feelings and mental health. Every card in the "Empathy Deck" has an emoji that symbolizes a certain feeling and a mental health-related sentence or prompt that goes along with it. People can use the deck as a tool to talk about empathy and emotional support, as well as to explore and express their feelings. The "Empathy Deck" by Scourti welcomes users to interact in a positive and approachable manner with both their own and other people's emotions. In order to promote empathy, understanding, and a sense of community among participants, the initiative offers a written and visual framework for talking about feelings. Scourti's interest in the nexus of communication, emotion, and technology is evident in the project. Emotions are a common form of digital communication. Scourti examines how technology affects our perceptions of emotion and interpersonal connection by combining emoticons with mental health-related questions.

== Exhibitions ==
Solo Exhibitions

Profiles of You, EMST National Museum of Contemporary Art, Athens, 2023 [solo]

Chief Complaint, Almanac Projects, 2018 [solo]

Spill Sections, Studio RCA Riverlight 22, 2018 [solo]

Group Exhibitions

Survival Kit 13, Latvian Centre for Contemporary Art, 2022, curated by Iliana Fokianaki

Athens Biennale 7: ECLIPSE Athens, Sept 24- Nov 28th 2021

24/ 7: A wake-up call for our non-stop world, Somerset House, 2020

Machines of Loving Grace, High Line, New York, 2019

We Were Having a Little Flirt, Pump House Gallery, group show, 2018

Gjon Mili 2017: Award Exhibition, The National Gallery of Kosovo, 2017

Group Therapy, UNSW Galleries, Sydney, 2017

More Than Just Words [On the Poetic], Kunsthalle Wien, Vienna, 2017

Feral Kin, Autoitalia, 2017

Bedlam: The Asylum and Beyond, Wellcome Collection, Sept 2016—Jan 2017

Third Party, CTRL+SHIFT Collective, Oakland, USA 2016

Fireflies, Niarchos Centre, Athens; 2016

== Collections ==
National Museum of Contemporary Art (EMST)

== Authored works ==
Altered States, Ignota Press, 2021

Exit Script, text for Athens Biennale 7 Catalogue, 2021

Mine Searching Yours, collaboration with Caspar Heinemann for Forma Arts, 2021

On Care, MA Bibliothèque ed. Sharon Kivland and Rebecca Jagoe, 2020

The Happy Hypocrite [guest editor], Book Works, October 2019

Spells: 21st Century Occult Poetry Ignota Press, October 2018

Across and Beyond: A Transmediale reader, Sternberg Press, 2017

Profiles of You, essay chapter in Fiction as Method, Sternberg Press, 2018

Documents of Contemporary Art: Information, MIT Press and Whitechapel, 2016
