= Erica Wilson =

English-born American embroidery designer

Erica Moira Susan Wilson
- Born: 8 October 1928; Tidworth, England
- Died: 13 December 2011 (aged 83); Manhattan, New York

Erica Wilson (8 October 1928 – 13 December 2011) was an English-born American embroidery designer based in New York, known particularly for needlepoint. She also designed wallcoverings and greeting cards. Her designs were published by Vogue and the Metropolitan Museum of Art, among others. Wilson earned the nicknames "Julia Child of embroidery" and "America's first lady of stitchery" for her work.

Wilson was born in Tidworth, England on 8 October 1928. She moved to Bermuda with her parents as a baby, when her father, a British military colonel, was stationed on the island. She lived in Bermuda for five years, until her parents' divorce. Wilson was raised in England and Scotland after moving from Bermuda, but recalled the move as upsetting. "I was broken-hearted at leaving the only home I'd ever known."

Wilson first embroidered, with tapestry wool, when she was five. She began her studies at the Royal School of Needlework in London in 1945, and graduated three years later, having stitched many standard designs, but also some of her own devising.

Wilson immigrated to the United States in 1954 to work as a needlework instructor. Some of her early students included Mrs. Procter (of Procter & Gamble) and Mrs. Watson (of IBM Watson family). She married furniture designer Vladimir Kagan in 1957. They have three children.

In addition to her design work, Wilson published a syndicated newspaper column, Needleplay; was the host of two Public Television series on embroidery (1970s to 1980s); and wrote 16 books on embroidery. More recently she appeared as a guest on The Carol Duvall Show (HGTV). She also had a shop in New York City (Erica Wilson Needleworks) for 33 years.

Also, there is an "Erica Wilson-Heirloom Guild".

== Selected publications ==
- Crewel embroidery. (1962)
- Craft of silk and gold thread embroidery and stump work. (1973)
- Erica Wilson's embroidery book. (1973)
- Erica Wilson's quilts of America. (1979)
- Erica Wilson's needlework to wear. (1982)
- Erica Wilson's Christmas world. (1980)
- Erica Wilson's children's world. (1983)
- Erica Wilson's smocking. (1983)
- Erica Wilson's knitting book. (1987)
