= Erica White (artist) =

British sculptor and portrait painter (1904–1991)

- Born: Erica Mildred White; June 13, 1904; Ealing, London
- Died: 1991 (aged 86–87); Bexhill-on-Sea, Sussex
- Education: Slade School of Fine Art; Central School of Arts and Crafts; Royal Academy Schools
- Known for: Sculpture

Erica Mildred White (13 June 1904 – 1991) was a British sculptor and portrait painter.

== Biography ==
White was born in Ealing, now a part of London, to a mother from Sussex and a father who was a solicitor from Somerset. After attending St George's School in Harpenden, White studied at the Slade School of Fine Art in central London, where she won a painting prize. After the Slade, White entered the Central School of Arts and Crafts and was awarded a sculpture scholarship before studying at the Royal Academy Schools where she won silver and bronze medals and a Feodora Gleichen memorial grant. After graduating White created sculpture figures, heads and busts in stone, clay and bronze as well as painting portraits in both oils and pastels. Between 1925 and 1959, she was a regular exhibitor at the Royal Academy in London and also had works shown at the Royal Glasgow Institute of the Fine Arts, with the Society of Women Artists, the Royal West of England Academy and at commercial galleries in southern England. White was an elected Fellow of the Royal Society of British Sculptors.

For many years White lived at Hampstead in north London and then had a studio at Kingsdown in Kent before spending her later years at Bexhill-on-Sea in Sussex.
