= Erica-Irene Daes =

Greek academic & diplomat (1925-2017)

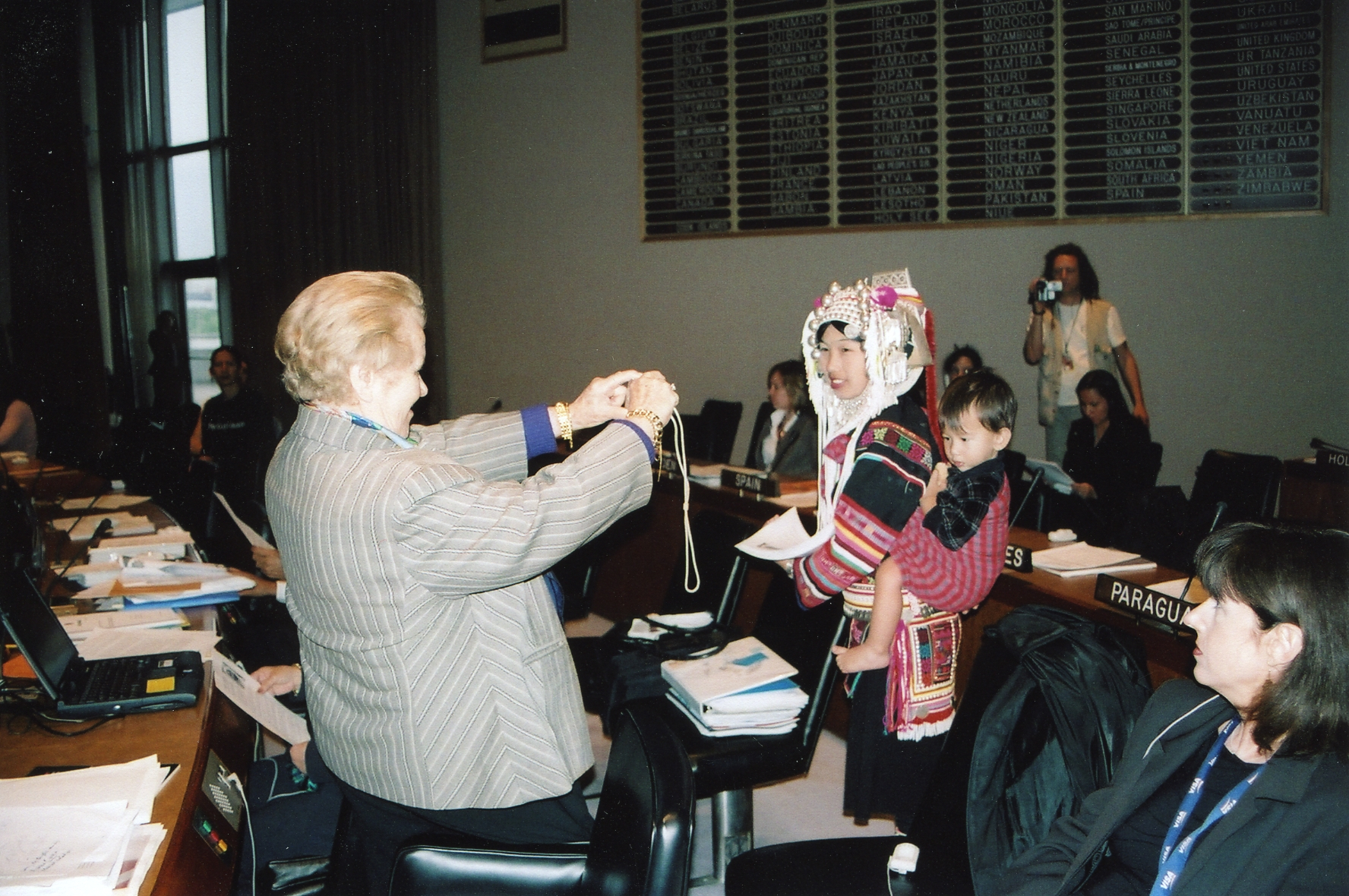
- Erica-Irene Daes taking a photo in 2006
- Born: 18 September 1925
- Died: 12 February 2017 (aged 91); Athens, Greece
- Education: University of Athens
- Known for: Chairing the United Nations Working Group on Indigenous Populations (1984–2001); authoring many United Nations reports on Indigenous rights issues; initial drafting & a driving force behind the Declaration on the Rights of Indigenous Peoples

Erica-Irene Daes (18 September 1925 – 12 February 2017) was an academic, diplomat, and United Nations expert best known for her almost 20 years work with the United Nations Working Group on Indigenous Populations (1984–2001) promoting the cause of the world's indigenous peoples, during which time she authored many United Nations reports on Indigenous rights issues and was a driving force behind the United Nations Declaration on the Rights of Indigenous Peoples.

She was the Founding Chairperson & Special Rapporteur, United Nations Working Group on Indigenous Populations; Member, United Nations Sub-Commission on the Promotion and Protection of Human Rights.

== Published works ==
- Freedom of the individual under law : a study on the individual's duties to the community and the limitations on human rights and freedoms under Article 29 of the Universal Declaration of Human Rights (Book)
- The individual's duties to the community and the limitations on human rights and freedoms under article 29 of the Universal Declaration of Human Rights : a contribution to the freedom of the individual under law (study)
- Status of the individual and contemporary international law : promotion, protection and restoration of human rights at national, regional and international levels (Book)
- Protection of the heritage of indigenous people (Book)
- Justice pending : indigenous peoples and other good causes : essays in honour of Erica-Irene A. Daes (Book)
- Principles, guidelines, and guarantees for the protection of persons detained on grounds of mental ill-health or suffering from mental disorder : a contribution to (a) the protection of the fundamental freedoms, human and legal rights of persons who are mentally ill or suffering from mental disorder; (b) the abolition of psychiatric abuses; (c) the promotion of mental health law and medical practice; and (d) the improvement of mental health care and mental institutions (Book)
- Indigenous peoples : keepers of our past, custodians of our future (Book)
- Principles, guidelines and guarantees for the protection of persons detained on grounds of mental ill-health or suffering from mental disorder : a contribution to (a) the protection of the fundamental freedoms, human, and legal rights of persons who are mentally ill or suffering from mental disorder; (b) the abolition of psychiatric abuses; (c) the promotion of mental health law and medical practice, and (d) the improvement of mental health care and mental institutions (report)
- Liberté de l'individu en droit : Etude des devoirs de l'individu envers la communauté et limitations des droits et libertés de l'homme en vertu de l'article 29 de la Déclaration universelle des droits de l'homme (Book)
- Protection du patrimoine des populations autochthones
