= MV Erika =

Tanker built in 1975

Coordinates: 47°9′N 4°15′W

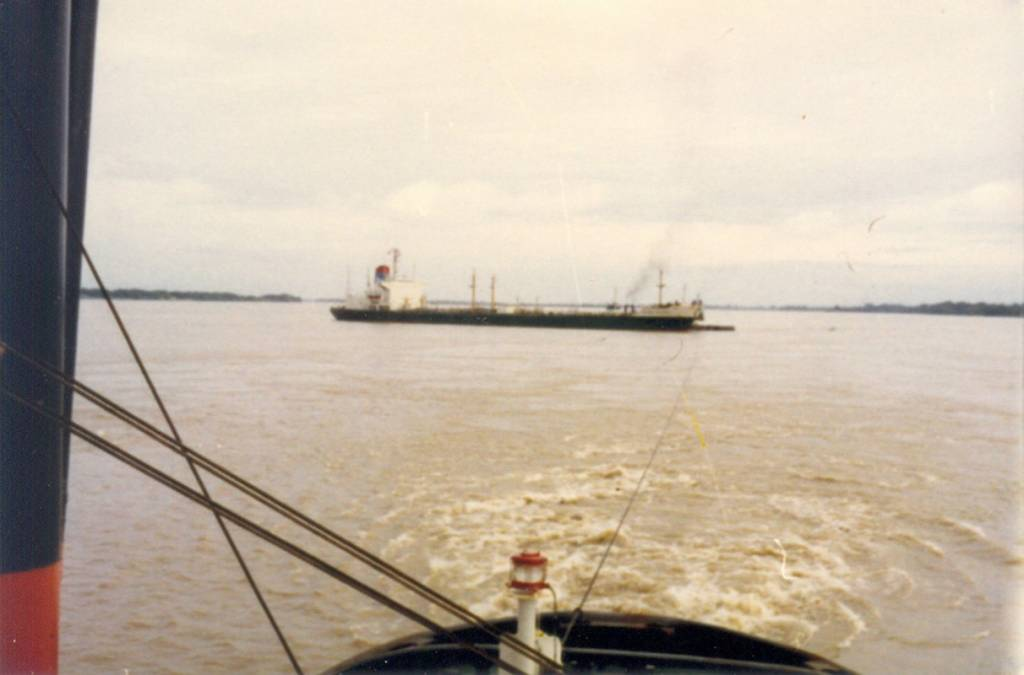
- Erika as Intermar Prosperity at Orinoco River in 1979.

History
- Name: Erika
- Owner: Tevere Shipping (Malta)
- Operator: Panship
- Port of registry: Malta
- Builder: Kasado Dock Company, Japan
- Launched: 17 October 1974
- Completed: 1975
- Maiden voyage: 1975
- In service: 1975
- Out of service: 12 December 1999
- Renamed: Shinsei Maru (1975); Glory Ocean (1975–1977); Intermar Prosperity (1977–1984); South Energy (1984–1985); Jahre Energy (1985–1990); Prime Nobel (1990–1994); Nobel (1994–1996); Erika (1996–1999)
- Identification: IMO number: 7377854; Call sign: 9HEZ3
- Fate: Sunk on 12 December 1999

General characteristics
- Type: Oil tanker
- Tonnage: 37,283 DWT
- Length: 184 m (603 ft 8 in) (LOA)
- Draught: 10.9 m (35 ft 9 in)
- Propulsion: Sulzer main engine, 9,800 kW (13,200 hp)

MV Erika (formerly Shinsei Maru, Glory Ocean, Intermar Prosperity, South Energy, Jahre Energy, Prime Nobel and Nobel) was an oil tanker built in 1975 and last chartered by Total-Fina-Elf. She sank off the coast of France in 1999, causing a major environmental disaster.

== Background ==
Erika was one of eight sister ships built in Japan. Despite having 10% less steel than many other tankers of similar size, Erika was very popular amongst shipping companies because of its relative inexpensiveness.

== Sinking ==
On 8 December 1999, the vessel sailed out of Dunkirk, bound for Livorno and with a cargo of around 31,000 tons of heavy fuel oil. Erika ran into a heavy storm as it entered the Bay of Biscay. On 12 December 1999, the tanker broke in two and sank, releasing thousands of tons of oil into the sea, killing marine life and polluting shores around Brittany, France.

Course and oil spill

List of certificates issued for Erika by RINA:

- International Load Line Certificate – Dated 16 December 1998 valid until 31 August 2003
- Safety Construction Certificate – Dated 16 December 1998 valid until 31 August 2003
- International Pollution Certificate – Dated 16 December 1998 valid until 31 August 2003
- Safety Equipment Certificate – Dated 16 December 1998 valid until 14 August 2000
- Radio Certificate – Dated 23 November 1999 valid until 31 March 2000

Total said that the classification society, Registro Italiano Navale (RINA) had reported that the tanker was in good condition, and that it routinely required certificates of good condition for vessels more than 20 years old. The incident triggered new European Union legislation as regard to transport by sea.

On 16 January 2008, Total, Giuseppe Savarese (the shipowner), Antonio Pollara (the handler) and RINA (the expert company) were sentenced in solidum to pay indemnities of €192 million (US$280 million), plus individual penalties. The judgement, while recognizing the risks inherent to oceangoing vessels, reckoned Total SA was "guilty of imprudence", from the fact that Total did not take into account "the age of the ship", (nearly 25 years), and "the discontinuity of its technical handling and maintenance". On 30 March 2010, Total SA lost their appeal to overturn the court's decision.

== See also ==
- EU Erika packages of law I, II and III
