= Fern (name) =

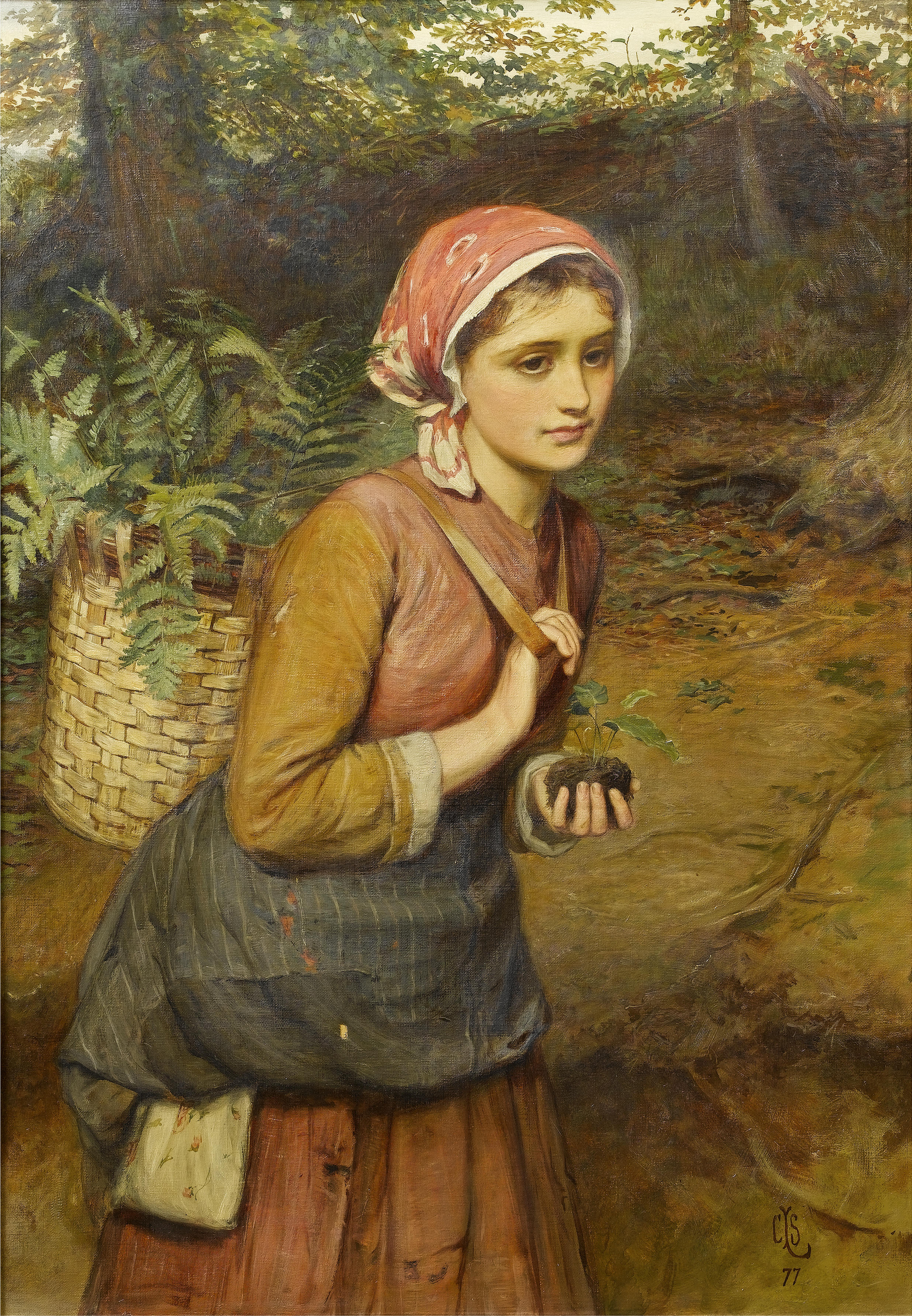
- The Fern Gatherer by Charles Sillem Lidderdale, 1877.
- Gender: Unisex

Origin
- Origin: English
- Meaning: plant name

Fern is an English topographic name from the Old English fearn. It refers to someone who lives among ferns. The name is used as a given name and a surname. The name is in use primarily in English-speaking countries. It has been in use since the 1800s and has also occasionally been in use for boys, though it is primarily a feminine name. There were 133 newborn American girls named Fern in 2020, 140 in 2021, 148 in 2022, and 156 in 2023. There were 26 newborn girls given the name in Canada in 2021.

Notable people with the name Fern or Ferns include:

== Given name ==
- Fern Andra (1893–1974), American actress
- Fern Battaglia (1931–2001), American baseball player
- Fern Bell (1913–2000), American baseball player
- Fern Brady (born 1986), Scottish comedian
- Fern Britton (born 1957), English television presenter
- Fern G. Z. Carr (born 1956), Canadian poet
- Fern Schumer Chapman (born 1954), American journalist
- Fern Coppedge (1883–1951), American painter
- Fern Cunningham, American sculptor
- Fern Deacon (born 1998), English actress
- Fern Emmett (1896–1946), American film actress
- Fern Ferguson, American baseball player
- Fern Fitzgerald (born 1947), American actress
- Fern Gauthier (1919–1992), Canadian ice hockey player
- Fern Headley (1901–1956), American ice hockey player
- Fern Hobbs (1883–1964), American attorney
- Fern Holland (1970–2004), American lawyer
- Fern Hunt (born 1948), American mathematician
- Fern Jones (1923–1996), American gospel singer
- Fern Kinney (born 1949), American singer
- Fern Kupfer (born 1946), American author
- Fern LeBlanc (born 1956), French professional ice hockey player
- Fern Majeau (1916–1966), French ice hockey player
- Fern Mallis (born 1948), American consultant
- Fern Michaels (born 1933), American author
- Fern Hubbard Orme (1903–1993), American politician
- Fern Perreault (1927–2021), French ice hockey player
- Fern Persons (1910–2012), American film actress
- Fern Rahmel (1914–2009), Canadian writer
- Fern Riddell (born 1986), British historian
- Fern Rivard (1946–1993), Canadian ice hockey player
- Fern Flanagan Saddler (born 1955), American judge
- Fern Sawyer (1917–1993), American cowgirl
- Fern Shaffer (born 1944), American painter
- Fern Shubert (born 1947), Republican political figure
- Fern Shumate (1910–2003), American writer
- Fern Shollenberger (1923–1977), American baseball player
- Fern M. Smith (born 1933), American judge
- Fern Blodgett Sunde (1918–1991), Canadian wireless radio operator
- Fern Sutherland (born 1987), New Zealand actress
- Fern Villeneuve (1927–2019), Canadian aviator
- Fern Whelan (born 1988), English footballer

== Stage name ==
- Fern (rapper) (born 1979), Puerto Rican rapper

== Surname ==
- Charlie Fern, American speechwriter and journalist
- Cody Fern, Australian actor, screenwriter
- Fanny Fern, pseudonym of American writer Sara Willis Parton
- Fritzi Fern, motion picture actress from Akron, Ohio
- George Fern, English footballer
- Harold Fern, British president of swimming's world governing body FINA
- Henry Ferne, Chaplain Extraordinary to Charles I
- Joseph J. Fern, first Mayor of Honolulu
- Rodney Fern (1948–2018), English footballer
- Ronald Ferns, English illustrator, designer, cartoonist and surrealist painter
- Tan Paey Fern, Singaporean table tennis player
- Tom Fern, English footballer

== Fictional characters ==
- Fern Walters, from the children's book and animated television series Arthur
