= Frederika =

Frederika may refer to:

- Frederika Alexis Cull, Indonesian beauty queen
- Frederika, Iowa, city in the United States
- Frederika Township, Bremer County, Iowa, township in the United States

== See also ==
- Frederica (given name)
- Frederica (disambiguation)
- Fredrika (disambiguation)
- Princess Frederica (disambiguation)
- Federica
- Frédérique
