= Frederique =

Frederique is a French female given name, which is equivalent to the male name Frederick, meaning "peaceful ruler". Alternative spellings include Frédérique and Frederieke. The name Frederique may refer to:

== People ==
- Frédérique Apffel-Marglin (born 1951), American anthropologist
- Frédérique Audouin-Rouzeau (born 1957), French writer
- Frédérique Bel (born 1975), French actress
- Frederique Darragon (1949), French explorer
- Frederique Derkx (born 1994), Dutch hockey player
- Frédérique Dumas (born 1963), French film producer
- Frédérique Lambert (born 1992), Canadian racquetball player
- Frédérique Lenger (1921–2005), Belgian mathematics educator
- Fredrique Paijkull (1836-1899), Swedish educator
- Frédérique Petrides (1903–1983), American conductor
- Frédérique Ries (born 1959), Belgian politician
- Frederieke Saeijs (born 1979), Dutch violinist
- Frédérique Turgeon (born 1999), Canadian para-alpine skier
- Frederique van der Wal (born 1967), Dutch model and businesswoman

Surname

- OJ Frederique Jr., American football player

== See also ==
- Federica
- Frederica (given name)
