= Frederica (given name) =

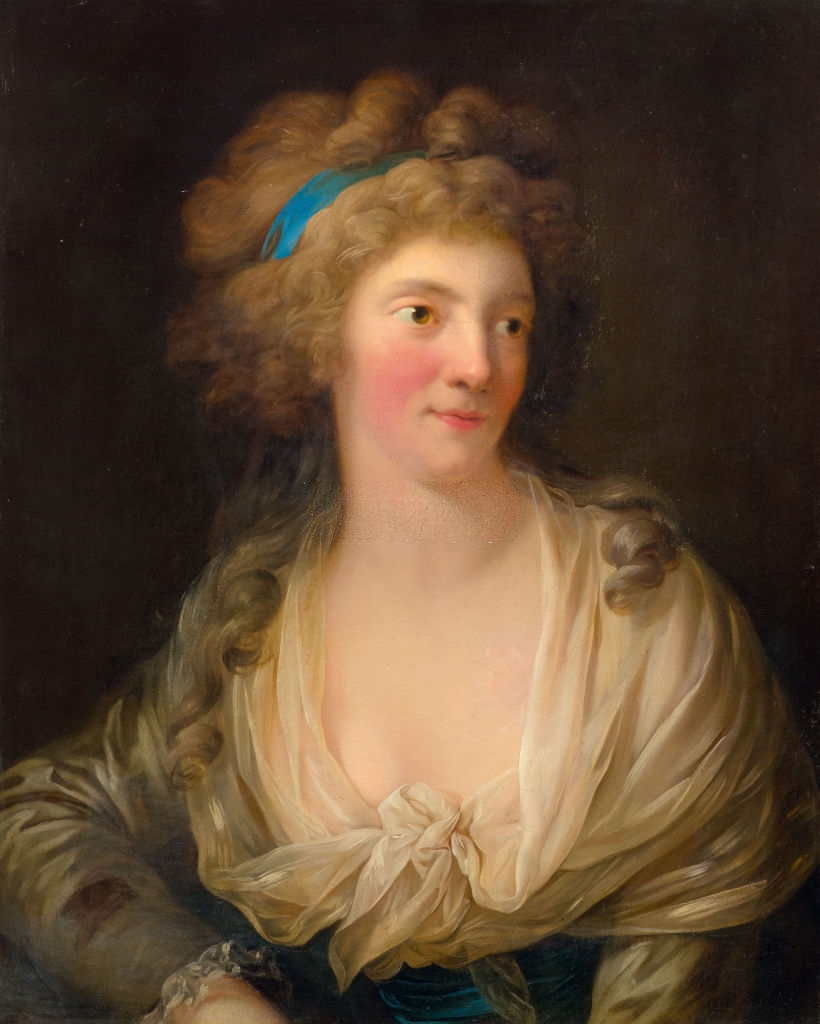
- Princess Frederica Charlotte of Prussia
- Pronunciation: /frɛdəˈriːkə/ fred-ə-REE-kə
- Gender: Female

Origin
- Origin: Germanic
- Meaning: "peaceful ruler"

Frederica is a feminine given name meaning "peaceful ruler". It is closely related to the masculine name Frederick, of Germanic origin. Its meaning is derived from the Germanic word elements frid, or peace, and ric, meaning "ruler" or "power".

Notable people with the name include:

- Frederica Chase Dodd (1893–1972), American social worker
- Frederica Darema, Greek American physicist
- Frederica Detmers (1867–1934), American botanist
- Frederica Louise Ernst (1714–1781), Danish slave trader and ship owner
- Frederica Freyberg, American television anchor and producer
- Frederica Going (1895–1959), American actress
- Frederica Jansz, Sri Lankan journalist
- Frederica de Laguna (1906–2004), American ethnologist, anthropologist, and archaeologist
- Frederica Sagor Maas (1900–2012), American dramatist and playwright
- Frederica Massiah-Jackson (born 1951), American judge
- Frederica Mathewes-Green (born 1952), American author and speaker
- Frederica Perera (born 1941), American environmental health scientist
- Frederica Piedade (born 1982), Portuguese tennis player
- Frederica Plunket (1838–1886), Irish aristocrat
- Frederica Maclean Rowan (1814–1882), British author and translator
- Frederica von Stade (born 1945), American singer
- Frederica J. Turle (1880–1936), British author of juvenile fiction
- Frederica Williams (born 1958), American health administrator
- Frederica Wilson (born 1942), American politician

== Variants ==
- Bedřiška – Czech
- Federica – Italian, Spanish
- Fredi – English
- Freddy – English
- Freddie – English
- Freddi – English
- Freddey – English
- Frederica – English, Portuguese
- Frederikke – Danish
- Frédérique – French
- Frédérika – French
- Fredrika – Finnish, Swedish
- Frici – Hungarian
- Friederike – German
- Friðrika – Icelandic
- Fritzi – German
- Fryderyka – Polish
- Φρειδερίκη (Freiderikē) – Greek
- Miroslava – Czech
- Rica – English
- Riika – Finnish
- Riikka – Finnish
- Rika – Dutch, Swedish
- Rike – German
- Rikke – Danish
- Frederiek – Dutch

== See also ==
- Frederica (disambiguation)
- Princess Frederica (disambiguation)
