= Alfonso X El Sabio University =

Private university in the Community of Madrid, Spain

Coordinates: 40.4519°N 3.9844°W

- Universidad Alfonso X El Sabio (UAX)
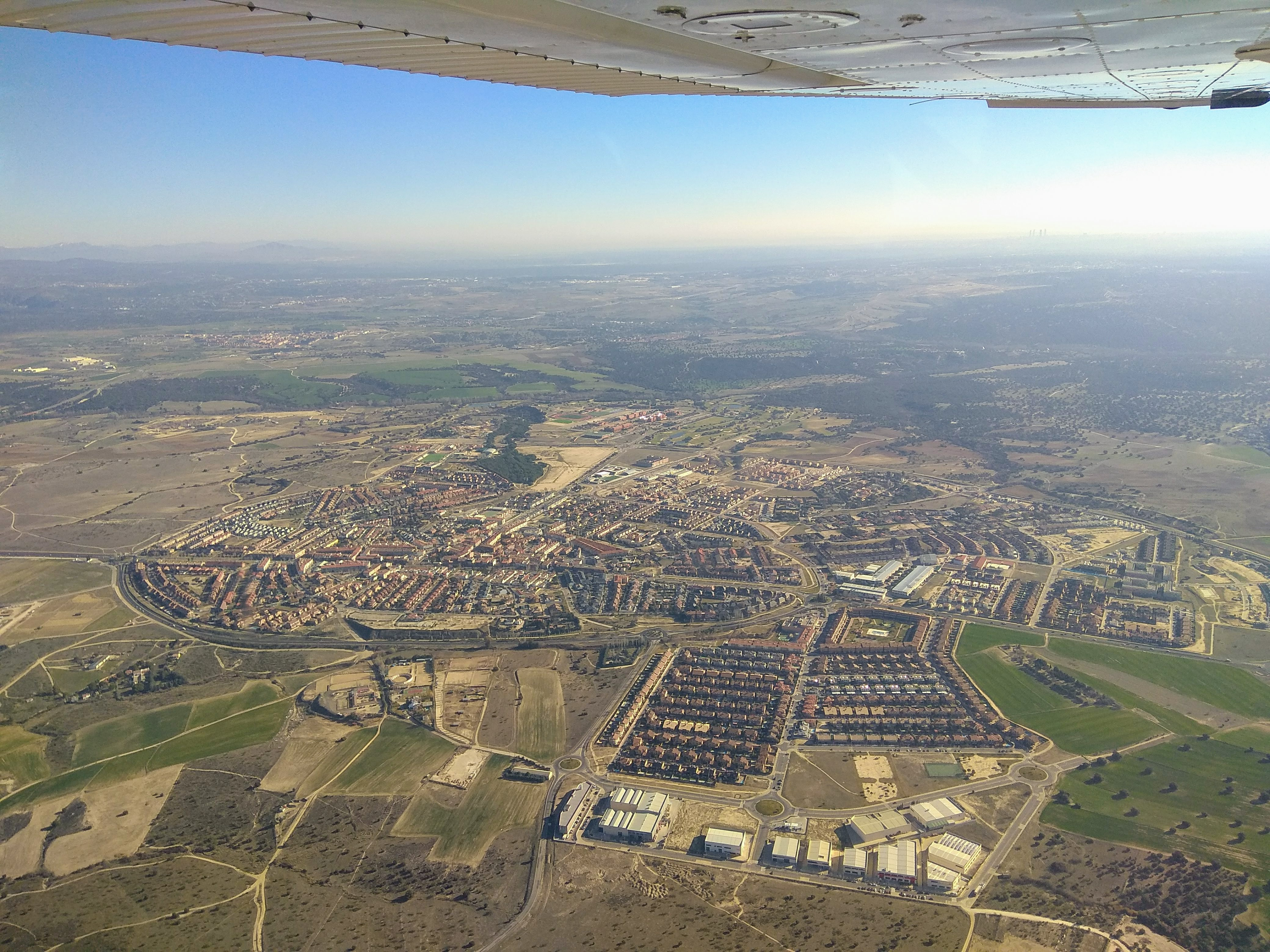
- Alfonso X El Sabio University
- Motto: BONUM EST DIFFUSIVUM SUI (Latin)
- Type: Private, for-profit
- President: Jesús Núñez Velázquez
- Rector: José Domínguez de Posada
- Location: Avd. Universidad, 1 Villanueva de la Cañada (main campus; it has a secondary campus in Madrid), Spain
- Campus: 248 acres (1000000 m^{2})
- Website: https://www.uax.com/
- Location in Community of Madrid Alfonso X El Sabio University (Spain)

Alfonso X el Sabio University (Universidad Alfonso X El Sabio in Spanish language, UAX) is a private university in the Community of Madrid, Spain.

As of March 2019, the university has 8,500 enrollments. The UAX offers its students the option of carrying out a university exchange in one of more than 150 universities. UAX's academic programs operate on a semester calendar beginning in late September and ending in June.

In March 2019, CVC Capital Partners invested in UAX with a five-year plan to grow the institution locally and internationally The deal was valued at €1.1 billion, according to Acuris.

== History ==
Founded in 1992, it was the first private Spanish university authorised by the country's parliament in 1993. Jesús Núñez created UAX after reaching an agreement with the Town Hall of Villanueva de la Cañada, which granted him the right to use 1 million m2 of land for 75 years on which to build the campus.

In 2019, UAX announced its partnership with the investment advisory firm CVC Capital Partners to build a new international leader in the higher education sector. The five-year plan includes both organic and inorganic growth. Organic growth will be driven by expanding the current offering, growing the number of online students and strengthening its professional training. CVC Capital Partners will become an indirect shareholder of UAX, providing the required financial resources for the business, while current shareholders will remain invested.

== Accreditation ==
UAX is fully adapted to the European Higher Education Area and the professional skills are recognised in all EU member states. Every year, it also welcomes a rapidly growing number of international students with programs like European's Erasmus Programme, Socrates and Leonardo

== Residence life ==
Residents on campus live in one of three buildings which look out on to the Guadarrama Mountain Range. Roughly 1,000 students live on campus during the academic year.

== Notable people ==
Alumni include Richard Rogers, Bianca Odumegwu-Ojukwu, Maria Rubert.

UAX's faculty includes scholars such as violinist Frederieke Saeijs, pianist Piotr Paleczny, composer Alfonso Maribona, Giuseppe Devastato, Kennedy Moretti, Ashan Pillai, Yehuda Gilad, chairman of Endesa Borja Prado
