= Fredrika =

Fredrika, a Swedish feminine given name, may also refer to:

== People ==
- Fredrika Bremer (1801-1865), Swedish author and feminist
- Fredrika Eleonora von Düben (1738-1808), Swedish dilettante painter and embroiderer
- Fredrika Limnell (1816-1897), Swedish philanthropist and salonist
- Fredrika Runeberg (1807-1879), Finnish writer
- Fredrika Stahl (1984- ), Swedish singer and songwriter
- Fredrika Stenhammar (1836-1880), Swedish opera singer
- Fredrika Wetterhoff (1844–1905), Finnish teacher

== Places ==
- Fredrika, Sweden, a locality

== Institutions ==
- Fredrika Bremer Association, Swedish women's organisation
- Fredrika Bremer Intermediate School, school in Minneapolis, Minnesota, USA

== See also ==
- Frederica (disambiguation)
- Frederika (disambiguation)
- Friederike (disambiguation)
- Princess Frederica (disambiguation) including Fredrika and other variant spellings
