= Federica =

Federica is a given name. Notable people with the name include:

- Federica Abbate (born 1991), Italian singer-songwriter, composer and lyricist
- Federica Angeli (born 1975), Italian journalist
- Federica Biscia (born 1980), Italian swimmer
- Federica Bonsignori (born 1967), professional tennis player from Italy
- Federica Botter (born 2001), Italian javelin thrower
- Federica Brandizzi, Italian botanist
- Federica Brunetti (born 1988), Italian professional basketball player
- Federica Cafferata (born 2000), Italian professional footballer
- Federica Carta (singer) (born 1999), Italian singer-songwriter
- Federica Carta (field hockey) (born 2000), Italian field hockey player
- Federica Cassol (born 2000), Italian cross-country skier
- Federica D'Astolfo (born 1966), Italian international footballer
- Federica Daga (born 1976), Italian politician
- Federica Dal Ri (born 1980), Italian female long-distance runner
- Federica De Bortoli (born 1976), Italian voice actress
- Federica Di Criscio (born 1993), Italian football defender or midfielder
- Federica Dieni (born 1986), Italian politician
- Federica Di Giacomo, Italian director
- Federica Di Palma, scientist at Genome British Columbia
- Federica Faiella (born 1981), Italian ice dancer
- Federica Falzon (born 2003), Maltese child opera singer
- Federica Febbo (born 1993), retired Italian rhythmic gymnast
- Federica Felini (born 1983), Italian model, singer and television personality
- Federica Foghetti (born 1968), Italian modern pentathlete
- Federica Fontana (born 1977), Italian television sports announcer
- Federica Fratoni (born 1972), Italian politician
- Federica Gori (1970–2008), Italian pornographic actress and television personality
- Federica Guidi (born 1969), Italian businesswoman
- Federica Guzmán (born 1981), Miss Venezuela World 2006
- Federica Haumüller (born 1972), Argentinian professional tennis player
- Federica Luppi, astronomer
- Federica Manzon (born 1981), Italian writer
- Federica Marchionni (born 1971), Italian-American businesswoman
- Federica Mogherini (born 1973), Italian politician and former High Representative of the European Union for Foreign Affairs and Security Policy
- Federica Montseny (1905–1994), Spanish anarchist, intellectual and Minister of Health
- Federica Moro (born 1965), Italian model and actress
- Federica Masolin (born 1985), Italian sports journalist and television presenter
- Federica Nargi (born 1990), Italian model, showgirl, television presenter and actress
- Federica Onori (born 1988), Italian politician
- Federica Panicucci (born 1967), Italian television host and radio personality
- Federica Pellegrini (born 1988), Italian swimmer
- Federica Radicchi (born 1988), Italian water polo player
- Federica Ranchi (born 1939), Italian film actress
- Federica Ridolfi (born 1974), Italian dancer and hostess on television
- Federica Rocco (born 1984), water polo defender from Italy
- Federica Sala (born 1993), Italian synchronised swimmer
- Federica Sallusto (born 1961), Italian biologist
- Federica Salva (born 1971), Italian yacht racer
- Federica Sanfilippo (born 1990), Italian biathlete
- Federica Scolari (born 1988), Italian dressage rider
- Federica Selva (born 1996), Sammarinese alpine skier
- Federica Silvera (born 1993), Uruguayan footballer and futsal player
- Federica Stabilini (born 1957), Italian swimmer
- Federica Stufi (born 1988), Italian volleyball player
- Federica Valenti (born 1969), Italian voice actress
- Federica Venturelli (born 2005), Italian cyclist
- Victoria Federica de Marichalar y de Borbón (born 2000), daughter of the Duchess and Duke of Lugo, and sixth in the line of succession to the Spanish throne

== See also ==
- 12817 Federica (1996 FM16), main-belt asteroid
