= Shumate =

Shumate is a surname. Notable people with the surname include:

- Anderson E. Shumate (1879–1947), American politician
- David Shumate, American poet
- Fern Shumate (1910–2003), American writer
- Harold Shumate (1893–1983), American screenwriter
- Ignatius Elgin Shumate (1834–1907), American politician
- Jabar Shumate (born 1976), American politician
- Jessamine Shumate (1902–1990), American artist, historian and cartographer
- Jim Shumate (1921–2013), American bluegrass fiddler
- John Shumate (1952–2025), American basketball player
- Keith Shumate (born 1965/66), American college baseball player and coach
- Mark Shumate (born 1960), American football player
- Whitney Shumate (1896–1966), American businessman and civic leader
