= Fritzie =

Fritzie is a given name. Notable people with the given name include:

- Fritzie Abadi (1915–2001), Syrian American painter, sculptor, and collage artist
- Fritzie Connally (born 1958), American baseball player
- Fritzie Zivic (1913–1984), American boxer

== See also ==
- Fritzi
