= SS Frederica =

SS Frederica is the name of the following ships:

- SS Frederica, a cargo ship shelled by the Ottoman cruiser Hamidiye and scuttled 1 November 1914
- SS Frederica (1890), originally a passenger ferry, became the minelayer Nilufer in 1912, struck a mine on 22 November 1914 in the Black Sea and sunk

== See also ==
- Frederica (disambiguation)
