= Michigan State University College of Engineering =

Engineering school

- Former name: The Division of Engineering
- Established: Mechanic arts est. 1885, College of Engineering est. 1907-08 academic year
- Endowment: $41.5 million in Research Expenditures for fiscal year 2008-09
- Principal: Thomas Voice, Ph.D. (Senior Associate Dean, College of Engineering)
- Dean: Leo Kempel, Ph.D.
- Director: Nicole Shook (Chief of Staff)
- Principal designate: John Verboncoeur, Ph.D. (Associate Dean, Research & Graduate Studies)
- Faculty: 468 (2021)
- Undergraduates: 6612 (2021)
- Postgraduates: 251
- Doctoral students: 556
- Location: East Lansing, MI
- Campus: MSU
- Website: www.engineering.msu.edu

The College of Engineering at Michigan State University (MSU) is made up of 9 departments with 168 faculty members, over 6,000 undergraduate students, 12 undergraduate B.S. degree programs and a wide spectrum of graduate programs in both M.S. and Ph.D. levels. Each department offers at least one degree program, however many include more than one degree, multi-disciplinary programs, certifications and specialties as well as other degree programs affiliated with other colleges at Michigan State University.

== Departments ==
- Applied Engineering Sciences (AES)
- Biomedical Engineering (BME)
- Biosystems and Agricultural Engineering (BAE)
- Chemical Engineering and Materials Science (CHEMS)
- Civil and Environmental Engineering (CEE)
- Computational Mathematics, Science, and Engineering (CMSE)
- Computer Science and Engineering (CSE)
- Electrical and Computer Engineering (ECE)
- Mechanical Engineering (ME)
- Technology Engineering (TechE)

== Undergraduate program ==
Approximately 6,000 undergraduate students are enrolled and 600-800 Bachelor of Science degrees are awarded annually.

=== Bachelor's Degrees ===
- Applied Engineering Sciences
- Biosystems Engineering
- Chemical Engineering
- Civil Engineering
- Computational Data Science
- Computer Engineering
- Computer Science
- Electrical Engineering
- Environmental Engineering
- Materials Science and Engineering
- Mechanical Engineering
- Technology Engineering

=== Multi-Disciplinary Programs ===
- Biomedical Engineering
- Environmental Engineering

== Graduate program ==
Each year, approximately 800 students are enrolled in advanced degree programs and nearly 200 MS and PhD degrees are awarded. Graduate programs are offered in biosystems engineering, chemical engineering, civil engineering, computer science, computational science, electrical engineering, environmental engineering, materials science, mechanical engineering, and engineering mechanics.

== Notable Research ==
The MSU college of engineering has been accredited with many developments in automotive industry. Recently the college of engineering was in the spotlight for their developments with the new "wave disc generator".

== Research centers and facilities ==
- Automotive Research Experiment Station (ARES)
- BEACON Center for the Study of Evolution in Action, an NSF Science and Technology Center
- Center for Anti-Counterfeiting and Product Protection (A-CAPP)
- Civil Infrastructure Lab
- Composite Materials and Structures Center (CMSC)
- Composite Vehicle Research Center (CVRC)
- Electromagnetics Research Group
- Electron Microscopy Facility
- Energy & Automotive Research Laboratories
- Fraunhofer Center for Coatings and Diamond Technologies (CCD)
- Great Lakes Bio energy Research Center (GLBRC)
- High Performance Computing Center
- MDOT Pavement Research Center of Excellence
- Midwest Hazardous Substance Research Center
- National Center for Pavement Preservation (NCPP)
- NOAA Center of Excellence for Great Lakes and Human Health
- Protein Expression Lab
- Structural Fire Testing Facility
- ZELRI-MSU Power Research Center

The professional or student-run groups and organizations available in the college are listed below.

- American Association of Blacks in Energy (AABE)
- American Institute for Chemical Engineers (AIChE)
- American Society of Agricultural and Biological Engineers (ASABE)
- American Society of Civil Engineers (ASCE)
- American Society of Mechanical Engineers (ASME)
- Association for Computing Machinery (ACM)
- Audio Enthusiasts and Engineers (AEE)
- Biomedical Engineering Society (BMES)
- Biosystems Engineering Student Club
- Chi Epsilon (XE)
- Division of Engineering Computing Services (DECS)
- Engineers Without Borders (EWB)
- Environmental Engineering Student Society(ESS)
- Eta Kappa Nu (ΗΚΝ)
- Formula SAE
- IEEE MSU Student Branch
- International Society of Pharmaceutical Engineering
- Leadership Advantage
- MSE Society
- Michigan State University's Amateur Radio Club (W8SH)
- Michigan State University's Society of Automotive Engineers Baja SAE
- MSU Women in Computing
- National Association of Black Chemists and Chemical Engineers (NOBCCHE)
- National Society of Black Engineers (NSBE)
- National Society of Professional Engineers (NSPE)
- Omega Chi Epsilon
- Pi Tau Sigma
- SAMPE (SAMPE)
- Society of Applied Engineering Sciences (SAES)
- Society of Hispanic Professional Engineers (SHPE)
- Society of Plastics Engineers (SPE)
- Society of Women Engineers
- MSU Solar Car Racing Team
- Student Engineering Council (SEC)
- Tau Beta Pi MSU Chapter
- Triangle Fraternity MSU Chapter
- Upsilon Pi Epsilon

== Summer Research Opportunities Program ==
The Summer Research Opportunities Program, formerly known as the Undergraduate Summer Research Program, is a program run through the College of Engineering that offers summer research opportunities for high-achieving undergraduate students in an effort to encourage them to consider pursuing graduate degrees and to provide an early opportunity to become involved in research.
