= Darragon =

Darragon is a French surname. Notable people with the surname include:

- Frederique Darragon (born 1949), French explorer
- Louis Darragon (1883–1918), French cyclist
- Roddy Darragon (born 1983), French cross-country skier and non-commissioned officer
