= Junior TV =

- Country: Italy
- Broadcast area: Italy

Programming
- Language: Italian
- Picture format: 4:3 SDTV

Ownership
- Owner: Profit

History
- Launched: 18 February 1985; 41 years ago
- Closed: 1 October 2003; 23 years ago

Junior TV was an Italian national television network and syndication circuit founded by Danilo Orsini, whose broadcasts began on 18 February 1985 and remained on air until 1 October 2003. It broadcast through a network of affiliated broadcasters, many with regional coverage and of a certain importance in the broadcasting area, with coverage of approximately 85% of the national territory, in all regions. It offered programming entirely dedicated to children and adolescents, with cartoons, anime, TV series, documentaries and entertainment programmes. 8 hours of programming covered the morning and afternoon slots. From 1996 to its closure it officially used the name JTV.

== History ==
Junior TV's schedule consisted of a daily four-hour block, which was distributed to its affiliate stations through pre-assembled tapes and with access to the logo of the network. The tape was usually broadcast twice, that is in the afternoon and a repeat the following morning. However, especially in the second half of the 1990s, the actual broadcast times were often at the discretion of the individual stations. In particular, some of them broadcast the "block" only once (in the morning or in the afternoon), or divided it into several parts by interspersing different programs, or reduced its duration by skipping some of the network's shows.

The cartoons broadcast were largely Japanese anime, alongside other productions from the western world; often shows that already aired on local and national networks, particularly of the mecha genre (such as UFO Robot Goldrake), but Junior TV also had the merit of premiering new titles to the Italian market. In 1989, for example, it was the first network in Italy to air Dragon Ball, at the time not subject to censorship by adaptation and with the original themes, in a first block of 54 episodes. From March 1996, Junior TV repeated the series with a new (slightly censored) dub which made it as far as episode 99; due to import problems, episodes 100 to 153 only arrived in spring 1998. (Dragon Ball was later repeated on Italia 1 from 1999, with the same Milanese dub made by Junior TV but with tightened censorship).

Junior TV was also the only channel to air the Australian series such as The Girl from Tomorrow (both seasons), Pugwall and Finders Keepers and the animated adaptations of Virtua Fighter and Street Fighter, both adapted from video game franchises.

Junior TV's line-up also included a variety of original productions. Among the best-known presenters were Giorgia Surina, Jocelyn Hattab, presenter of the first season of Baby Show, Vesna Luisi, Ida Spalla (actress in SuperDUT and presenter of a number of programs), Federica Fontana, Fabio Canino, who later worked for RAI, Maria Rita Parsi and Raul Cremona. In some programs, among them I PiùPazzi, Splash and JTV News, animated sketches created directly by the broadcaster appeared. Lastly, during weekends it carried animated feature-length films during the Film Week-end slot.

In 1996, publisher Terenzio Vergnano and Enrico Preziosi, the key shareholder of the network, took over the shares, and that autumn, the network suffered a restyling: the network changed its name from "Junior TV" to "JTV" and the parent company became JTelevision S.r.l.; the cartoons returned to being presented with short prologues made in the studio, as in the early years of the broadcaster, but with a more adolescent slant compared to the beginning. The band Animali Rari was also present in the studio, presenting some cover taken from the rock repertoire. The Junior mascot, a white rabbit dressed in red dungarees, disappeared. Among the hosts of the new main program Casa J (which was divided into various spaces including J-Mito, J-Sport, Kids On Line etc.) included a very young Giorgia Surina, a face little known to the general public at the time, even if she had already appeared in various television and paper advertising and the comedian-magician Mariano Navetta, known as "Mister Magic Mariano", who in the following years presented over 1500 editions of his show at Gardaland. Finally, the traditional logo with the speech bubble and the name of the circuit was replaced: in the 1996/'97 season an anthropomorphic J accompanied by the word "TV" was used, while from the following season a white and red "JTV" logo appeared enclosed in a circle, which would remain until the end.

From 1997 JTV started airing The Simpsons daily: up until then, in Italy, the show was considered to be a niche product aimed at a reduced audience. Up until then, the series was broadcast irregularly on Canale 5.

From autumn 1997 JTV experimented, during weekensd, the airing of OAV and feature-length anime movies without censorship, thanks to an agreement with Dynamic Italia which provided part of its VHS catalog for promotional purposes: among these, some movies from the Dragon Ball and Saint Seiya franchises were seen, as well as part of the OAV series Tenchi Muyo! Ryo-Ohki, but after a few months it limited to repeats. The Sunday programming was later integrated with various anime films already broadcast in the past and several "anime-like" montage productions made in Hong Kong starting from South Korean material by producer Joseph Lai. On trailers and promos, footage from the Ah My Goddess! OAVs appeared, but was never shown on the network. In the same way, the network also began to replicate the introductory scenes between one cartoon and another, and for more than a year, until the change of publisher, it only used archive images. In the same period Giorgia Surina landed on MTV, but the network continued to simultaneously rerun the episodes of Casa J in which she was among the hosts.

From 2000 up to its closure, the network was taken over by Raimondo Lagostena Bassi of the Profit group, already owner of Telecampione and later also of Odeon TV and other channels: more precisely, a new publishing company "JT S.r.l." was established, 65% owned by Profit and 35% by the previous JTelevision. Over the course of a few months, the JTV circuit was transformed through the departure of several local broadcasters (including Antenna 3 in Lombardy) and the entry of others, until it completely coincided with that of Odeon. Furthermore, programming began to be broadcast via satellite on a service channel to which the affiliated stations would connect, rather than distributed on cassette: therefore JTV broadcasts were broadcast simultaneously nationally.

JTV's unified programming was immediately concentrated only in the late afternoon, from 5pm to 7.30pm; but subsequently the daily space decreased further, so much so that by the end of 2001 only the slot from 6.30pm to 7.30pm was used. In its last period on air, the network carried repeats of Casa J, Armadillo Show with Bianca Maria Berardi, the Peanuts animated series and Tiger Mask. On 1 October 2003, Junior TV definitively ceased its broadcasts and was integrated into Odeon TV: in the following months Peanuts were broadcast at various times by Odeon, also adding the "JTV" logo on air. The word "JTV" sometimes remained on the screen inappropriately, even accompanying music and dance broadcasts. Finally it was eliminated.
