= Frederica =

Frederica or Fredrica may refer to:

- Frederica (given name), including a list of notable people who bear the name
- Frederica (novel), a romance novel by Georgette Heyer
- Frederica, Delaware, United States
- Frederica Academy, an American school
- Fort Frederica, a historic American fort
- Frederica naval action, a small naval battle during the American Revolutionary War
- Frederica Bernkastel, a character in the Japanese sound novel Higurashi no Naku Koro ni
- Princess Frederica (disambiguation), including princesses named Frederika and Friederike
- Frederica (1932 film), a German historical musical drama film
- Frederica (1942 film), a French comedy film

== Fredrica ==
- Fredrica Torkudzor (born 2004), Ghanaian footballer

== See also ==
- Erica (disambiguation)
- Frederika (disambiguation)
- Fredrika (disambiguation)
- Friederike (disambiguation)
- Fredrique Löwen (Fredrica Löf), (1760–1813), Swedish actress
- Maria Frederica von Stedingk, Swedish composer
