= Fritzi =

Fritzi is a feminine given name and nickname, often a short form (hypocorism) of Friederike, which may refer to:

== People ==
- Fritzi Brunette (1890–1943), American film actress
- Friederike Fritzi Burger (1910–1999), Austrian figure skater
- Fritzi Burr (1924–2003), American actress
- Fritzi Courtney (1923–2012), American film actress
- Fritzi Fern (1901–1932), American film actress
- Fritzi Gordon (died 1992), Austrian-born British bridge player
- Fritzi Haberlandt (born 1975), German actress
- Friederike Fritzi Löwy (1910–1994), Austrian swimmer
- Fritzi Massary (1882–1969), Austrian-American actress and soprano singer born Friederike Massaryk
- Fredericka Fritzi Ridgeway (1898–1961), American actress of the silent era
- Friederike Fritzi Scheff (1879–1954), American actress and singer
- Friederike Fritzi Schwingl (1921–2016), Austrian slalom and sprint canoer

== Fictional characters ==
- Character in the American comic strips Fritzi Ritz (1922–1968) and Nancy (1938– )
- Title character of the 2019 animated film Fritzi – A Revolutionary Tale based on the children's book Fritzi Was There.

== Theater and Film ==
- Fritzi – A Revolutionary Tale (2019), a film
- Fritzi (musical comedy) (1935), a play
