= Wisconsin Energy Institute =

Energy research center

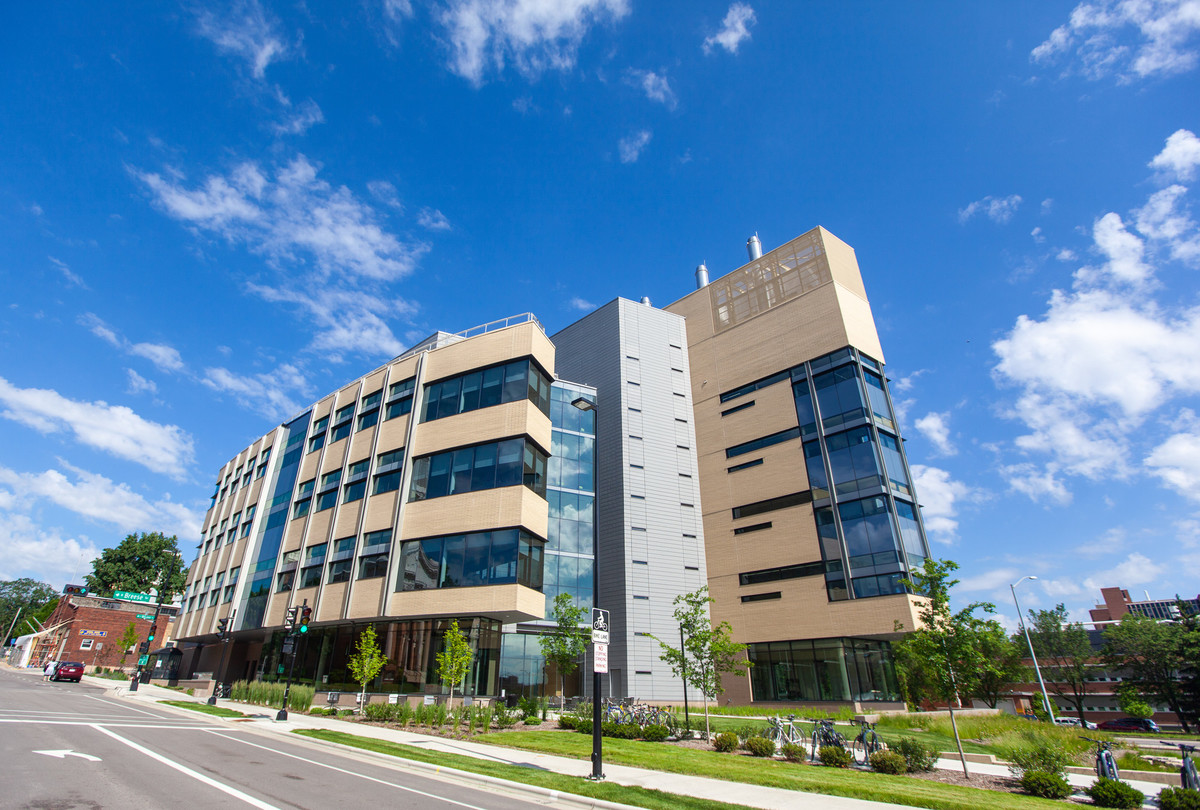
Wisconsin Energy Institute

The Wisconsin Energy Institute serves as the collaborative home of energy research and education for the University of Wisconsin-Madison campus and greater Midwestern region, and houses the Great Lakes Bioenergy Research Center, along with research space for the Nelson Institute for Environmental Studies.

Located at 1550 University Avenue, the building is bordered by the Wisconsin Institutes for Discovery to the east, the College of Engineering to the south, and the College of Agricultural & Life Sciences to the north. This location places the Wisconsin Energy Institute at the heart of what is known as the UW-Madison Energy Corridor.

Before construction, there was no single facility dedicated to energy research on the UW-Madison campus, though over 90 faculty worked in areas of clean energy research. These faculty members were scattered among 24 other campus buildings. Today, the facility houses over 200 researchers and administrators.

== Building information ==
=== Design and construction ===
Construction began in December 2010, was substantially complete in November 2012, and the building gained occupancy in January 2013.

Size: 107,000 sq ft
Cost: $57,153,600

Notable sustainable features include:

- Projected to use 48% less energy than code minimum
- Approximately 95% of construction waste was recycled
- 20 kW photovoltaic solar arrays predicted to provide 26,573 kWh annually
- 20-ton heat pump chiller system to employ waste heat
- An advanced heat recovery chiller, resulting in energy savings of 85,880 therms, or an annual cost savings of $55,943
- More than 35% of the building's electricity provided from green power
- Chilled beam technology used for cooling offices areas, which doesn't require air movement and increases energy efficiency
- Building design and orientation optimized for daylight, reducing electricity demand
- Low-flow plumbing fixtures improve water efficiency by 33% over typical fixtures
- Reclaimed and recycled wood, glass, steel and carpet used throughout the building
- Bio retention basin provides filtration of runoff water from the building roof and surrounding sidewalk areas
- Native landscape plantings reduce the need for watering

=== Awards ===
- LEED Gold, US Green Building Council
- Project of the Year, 2014 Commercial Design Awards, Madison InBusiness Magazine
- Green-Built Project, 2014 Commercial Design Awards, Madison InBusiness Magazine
- New Construction Award of Merit, 2013 Se2 Leadership Awards, Wisconsin Green Building Association
- Award of Merit in Safety, 2013 Midwest Awards, Engineering News Record
- Top Project, Top Projects of 2012, The Daily Reporter
- Awards for General Contractor in New Construction, 2013 Build Wisconsin Awards, Associated General Contractors of Wisconsin
- Award for Specialty Contractor in Exterior Finishes, 2013 Build Wisconsin Awards, Associated General Contractors of Wisconsin
- Specialty Trades Award in Mechanical, 2013 Projects of Distinction, Associated Builders and Contractors, Inc.
