= Federica Brandizzi =

Italian botanist

- Born: Rome, Italy

Academic background
- Education: BSc, PhD, Sapienza University of Rome

Academic work
- Institutions: Michigan State University; University of Saskatchewan
- Main interests: Golgi apparatus

Federica Brandizzi is an Italian botanist. She is the Michigan State University Foundation Professor of Plant Biology and a Fellow of the American Association for the Advancement of Science. Prior to joining MSU, Brandizzi was a Canada Research Chair in Plant Cell and Molecular Biology at the University of Saskatchewan.

== Early life and education ==
Brandizzi was born and raised in Rome, Italy. Her father was a Navy commander, and her mother was an archaeologist. She earned her Bachelor of Science degree and PhD at Sapienza University of Rome. Brandizzi then accepted a postdoctoral position at the University of Oxford.

== Career ==
Brandizzi remained at Oxford until 2003, when she was recruited to join the Department of Biology at the University of Saskatchewan. She was subsequently named a Canada Research Chair in Plant Cell and Molecular Biology to support her research on the inner workings of the endoplasmic reticulum. Brandizzi remained in Canada until 2006 when she joined the faculty at Michigan State University and the Great Lakes Bioenergy Research Center. During her early tenure at MSU, Brandizzi's research team isolated Arabidopsis mutants without a fully functional IRE1 pathway to understand the importance of IRE1 in managing stress. As a result of her research, Brandizzi received a grant from NASA to replicate her research using space as a stressor. In 2014, Brandizzi's research team loaded both isolated Arabidopsis seeds and standard seeds onto Falcon 9. Once the spacecraft reached the International Space Station (ISS), astronauts tended to the seeds and sent the sprouts back to Brandizzi's research team. Beyond growing seeds in space, Brandizzi also co-developed a new method to increase the amount of desired sugars in crops engineered for producing biofuels. In 2015, she was appointed an MSU Foundation Professor of Plant Biology.

In 2018, Brandizzi was elected a Fellow of the American Association for the Advancement of Science for her "distinguished contributions to the field of plant cell biology, particularly for the characterization of the endoplasmic reticulum and the Golgi apparatus, organelles pivotal to food production in plant cells." She was recognized as MSU's 2020 Innovator of the Year for her research on increasing plant size. The following year, she was named a University Distinguished Professor. In November 2022, Brandizzi and her research team loaded seeds enriched with amino acids and standard seeds onto Artemis I. The seeds were then analyzed upon their return to gain insights into how seeds can be protected against the effects of radiation. In recognition of their efforts to plant seeds in space, Brandizzi's research team received NASA's Group Silver Achievement Award. Brandizzi's efforts were recognized internationally in November 2024 with the Professor Luigi Tartufari Prize by the Accademia dei Lincei.
