= Danny Lam Nguyen =

American judge (born 1979)

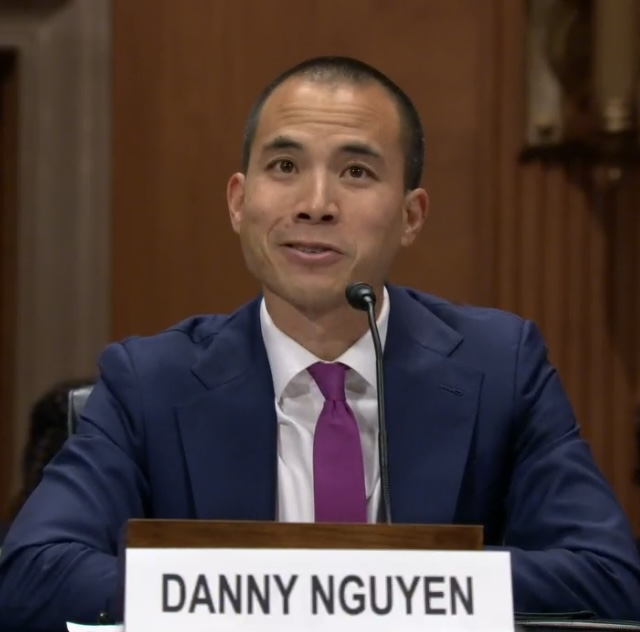

Associate Judge of the Superior Court of the District of Columbia
- Incumbent
- Assumed office July 29, 2024
- Appointed by: Joe Biden
- Preceded by: Fern Flanagan Saddler

Personal details
- Born: Danny Lam Hoan Nguyen; November 24, 1979 (age 46) Houston, Texas, U.S.
- Education: University of California, Los Angeles (BA, MEd); Georgetown University (JD)

Danny Lam Hoan Nguyen (born November 24, 1979) is an American lawyer who has served as an associate judge of the Superior Court of the District of Columbia since 2024. He previously served as associate general counsel at Booz Allen Hamilton from 2021 to 2024.

== Education ==
Nguyen earned his Bachelor of Arts in sociology and political science in 2001 and Master of Education in counseling and student affairs from the University of California, Los Angeles in 2003, and his Juris Doctor, magna cum laude, from the Georgetown University Law Center in 2006.

== Career ==
Upon graduation from law school, Nguyen served as a law clerk to Judge Reggie Walton of the United States District Court for the District of Columbia from 2009 to 2011. He then went into private practice with Wilmer Cutler Pickering Hale and Dorr. He previously served as an assistant United States attorney in the United States Attorney's Office for the District of Columbia, where he prosecuted cases involving domestic violence and sexual abuse. From 2018 to 2021, he was a trial attorney in the Criminal Division of the United States Department of Justice where he prosecuted complex financial fraud crimes. From 2021 to 2024, Nguyen served as associate general counsel at Booz Allen Hamilton.

== D.C. superior court service ==
=== Nomination under Trump ===
On May 20, 2020, President Donald Trump nominated Nguyen to serve as an associate judge of the Superior Court of the District of Columbia; his nomination was sent to the United States Senate later that day. President Trump nominated Nguyen to the seat vacated by Judge Carol Dalton, who retired. On January 3, 2021, his nomination was returned to the President under Rule XXXI, Paragraph 6 of the United States Senate. His nomination was resubmitted later that same day. On February 4, 2021, his nomination was withdrawn by President Joe Biden.

=== Nomination under Biden ===
On March 20, 2023, President Biden announced his intent to nominate Nguyen to serve as an associate judge of the Superior Court of the District of Columbia. On March 21, 2023, his nomination was sent to the Senate. President Biden nominated Nguyen to the seat vacated by Judge Fern Flanagan Saddler, who retired on April 22, 2022. A hearing on his nomination before the United States Senate Committee on Homeland Security and Governmental Affairs was held on September 7, 2023. On September 12, 2023, his nomination was reported out of committee by a 10–2 vote. On January 3, 2024, his nomination was returned to the president under Rule XXXI, Paragraph 6 of the United States Senate. He was renominated on January 11, 2024. On January 31, 2024, his nomination was reported out of committee by a 8–2 vote. On July 10, 2024, the Senate confirmed his nomination by voice vote. He was sworn in on July 29, 2024.

== Personal life ==
Nguyen's parents fled Vietnam as refugees. During his time at the United States Attorney's Office, Nguyen received two United States Attorney's Awards for Special Achievement.

Legal offices
Preceded by Fern Flanagan Saddler	Associate Judge of the Superior Court of the District of Columbia; 2024–present	Incumbent
