= Friederike of Hanover =

Friederike of Hanover may refer to:

- Frederica of Mecklenburg-Strelitz (1778–1841), Queen of Hanover
- Princess Frederica of Hanover (1848–1926)
- Frederica of Hanover (1917–1981), Queen of the Hellenes
