= Himalayan towers =

Defensive stone tower houses found in Tibet

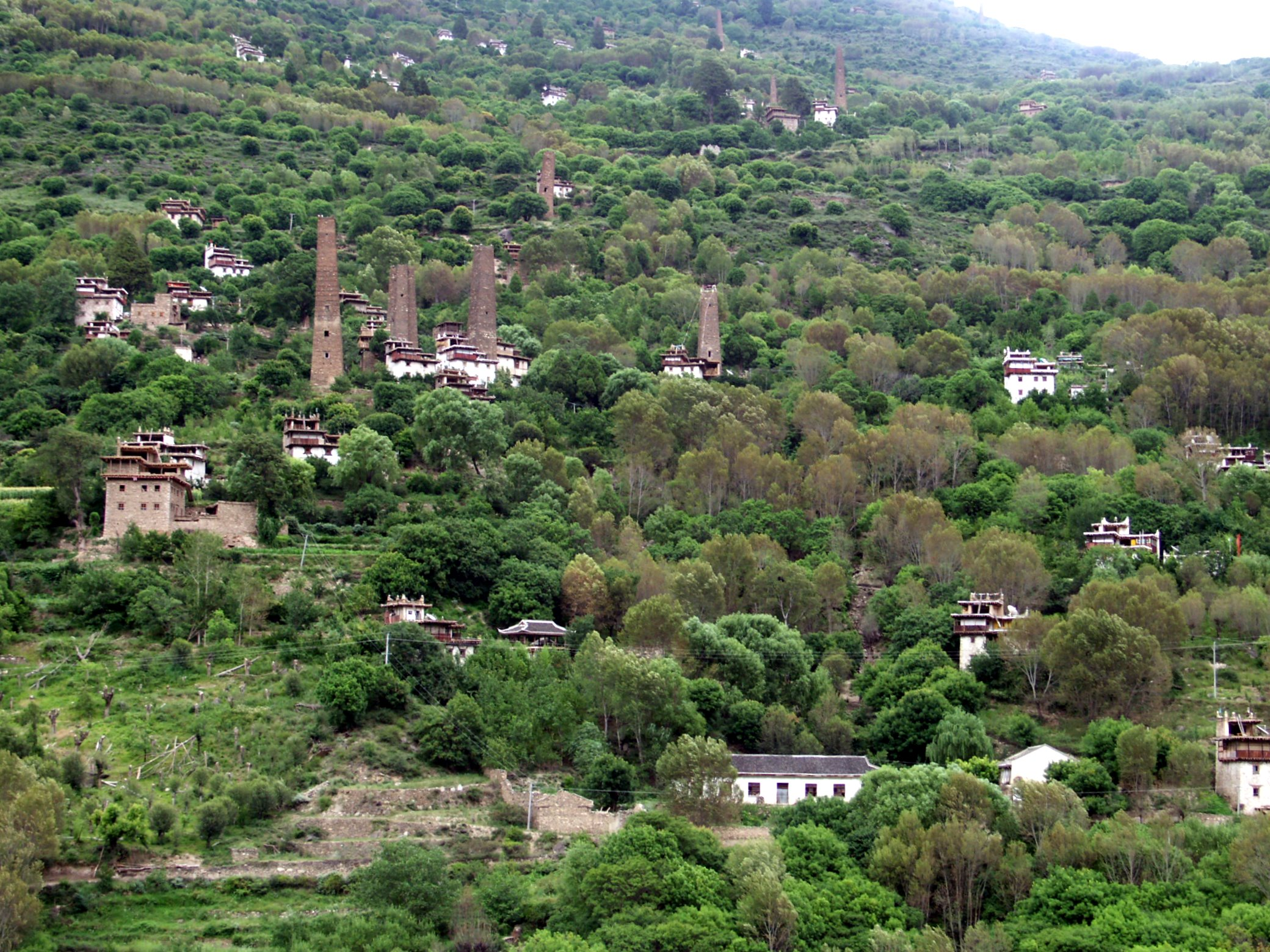
Himalayan towers in Danba, Sichuan

Himalayan towers, also called stone star-shaped towers, are stone tower houses found mostly in Gyalrong, a region of Tibet, as well as in the area inhabited by the modern Qiang people and in the historical region inhabited by the Tanguts.

These towers can be found both in cities and in uninhabited regions. They were described for the first time during the Ming dynasty (1368-1644). Since they are generally located in prosperous villages, it is believed that their primary function was that of a demonstration of a family's prestige within the community. At that time, wealth was acquired especially by the trade with the Mongols. For strength, many of the towers use a star pattern of walls as opposed to a strictly rectangular method. Their heights can exceed 60 meters (200 ft).

The towers were listed by World Monuments Fund in the endangered cultural sites list of the 2006 World Monuments Watch. The towers were unknown to mainstream cultural experts in China prior to its enlistment as an endangered site. The World Monument Fund has allocated resources to repair and conserve some of the towers which have been vandalized or neglected through time. Locals have been pushing for the declaration of the towers and its landscape to be part of the UNESCO World Heritage List.

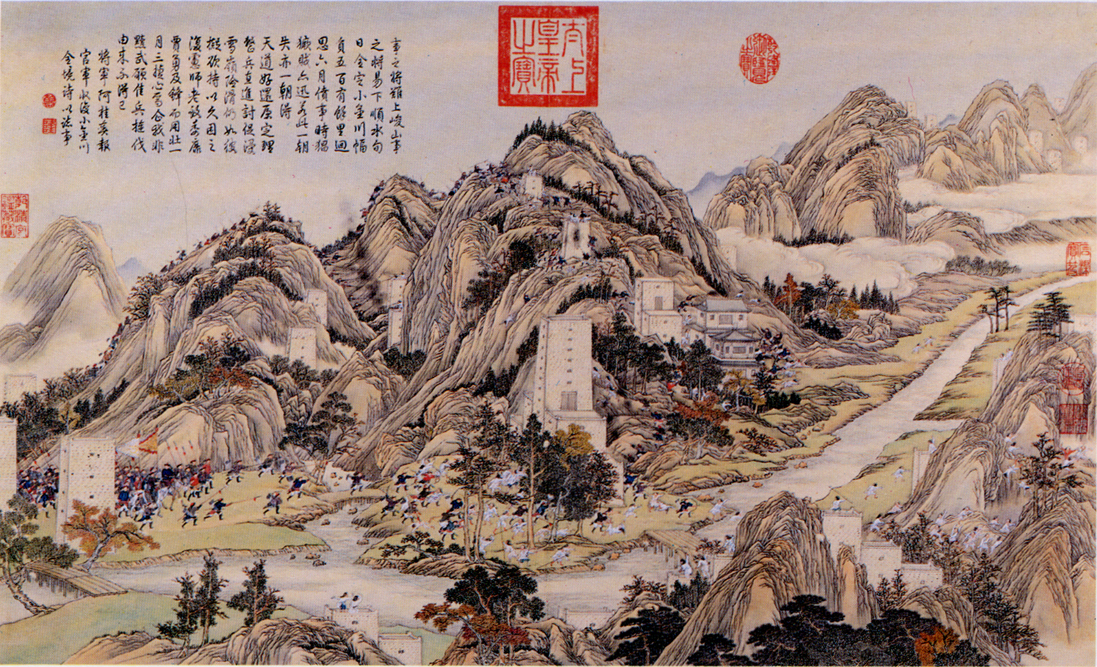
Himalayan towers depicted in a painting of the Jinchuan campaigns

== See also ==
- Diaolou
- Sky burial
