= Alfonso Maribona =

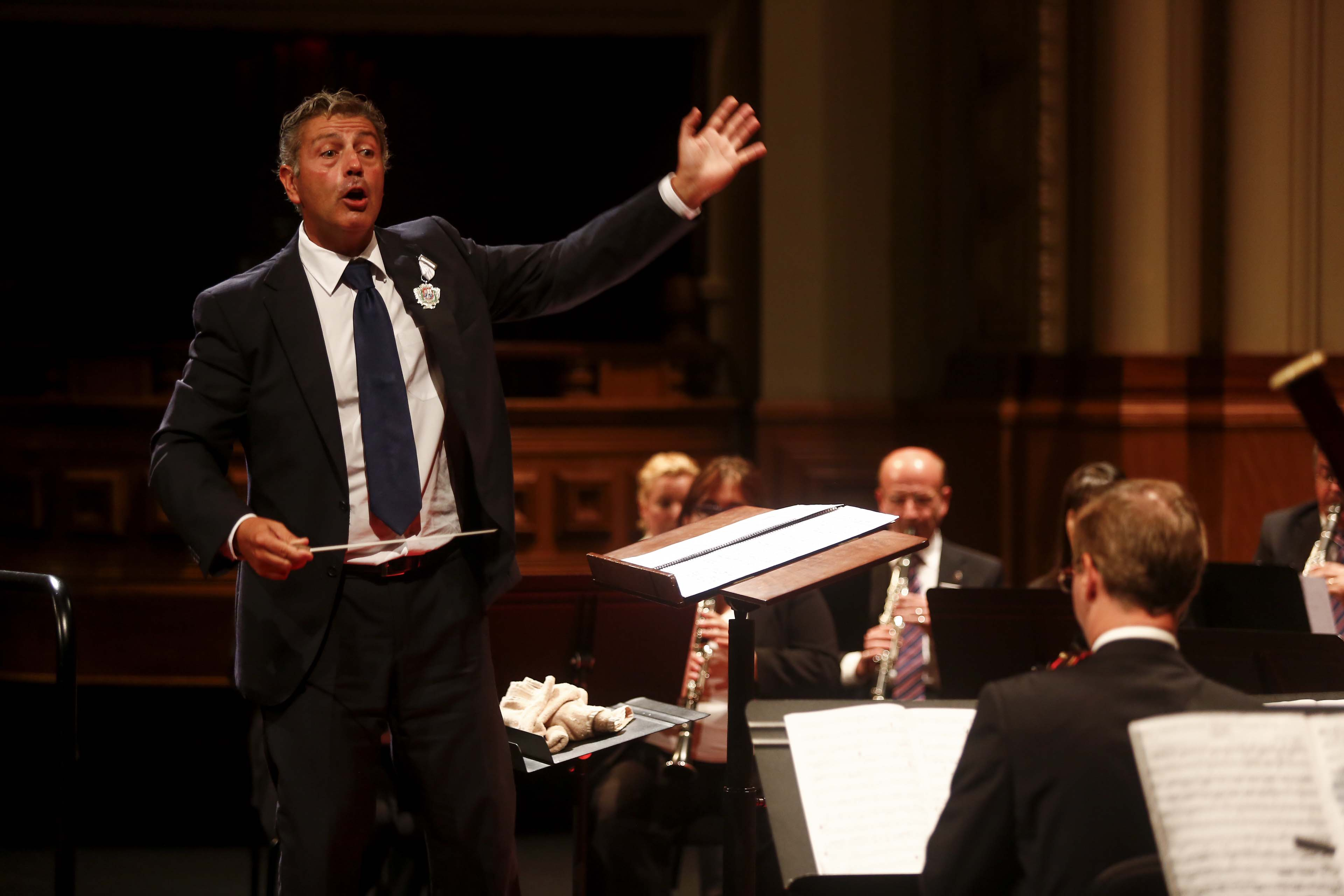
Alfonso Maribona

Alfonso Maribona is an orchestra conductor, pianist, composer and arranger. Maribona was born in Bilbao, and finished his piano and chamber music qualifications at the Royal Conservatory of Music in Madrid, at the same time winning First Prize at the End of Postgraduate Course by a unanimous decision. In 1982 he obtained Second Prize at the National Piano Competition, then in 1985 he was awarded First Prize at the same competition. In 1991 he won First Prize at the "Ciudad de Manresa" National Chamber Music Competition, and in the same year, by a unanimous jury verdict, he gained First Prize at the National Chamber Music Competition of Spain.

Based on his theoretical academic training, together with experience as soloist and orchestral musician, he has worked in the research and analysis of repertoire, as well as orchestra and band conducting techniques. Having successfully participated in two consecutive Courses at the International University Menéndez Pelayo of Santander, he made his debut at the Philharmonic Society of Bilbao in 1982. He later moved to Vienna where he extended his musical studies at the University of Music and Performing Arts, Vienna.

Since then his solo career has run parallel to his collaboration with a long list of leading European orchestras, such as the Spanish National Orchestra, Berlin Philharmonic / Deutsche Oper Berlin, Extremadura Orchestra, Orchestra and Youth Orchestra of Madrid, JONDE, Orquesta Sinfónica de Madrid, European Union Youth Orchestra, orchestra School of the Teatro Real de Madrid, Coro Euskeria, Excelentia orchestra, Bilbao Orkestra Sinfonikoa, Oporto Symphony Orchestra, Galicia Symphony orchestra, Academy of the University of Zaragoza, Beethoven Philharmonic, orchestra WYD Choir Carlos III University, Madrid Ensemble, Rafelbunyol Band, Choral Society of Bilbao, Madrid Municipal Symphonic Band, Firgas Ensemble, National Youth Orchestra of the Netherlands, Group Pro - Chamber, Madrid Trio, Trio BOS, Spanish Chamber orchestra, George Enescu Philharmonic Orchestra Bucharest, Kantorei Coral, Brasov Philharmonic orchestra, Transylvania State Philharmonic Orchestra of Cluj- Napoca, Macedonian Chamber Philharmonic Orchestra, RTVE Symphony Orchestra, among others. Apart from playing at concerts in practically all the main capitals around Spain, his activity as a soloist, arranger, and improviser has extended to recitals and recordings on tour, taking him to countries such as Germany, Italy, Romania, Austria, Montenegro, Serbia, North Macedonia, Ireland, France, Colombia, United States, and Japan.He has been invited as a solo artist and collaborator at numerous International Music Festivals and Congresses, where he has performed, conducted, and opened shows, while recording them at many of the leading Theatres and Concert Halls on the international stage. He has recorded covering a broad spectrum of the most varied styles at RTVE, Antena 3, Radio Nacional de España (Classical), Portland Recording Studio, Euskal Telebista, Radio Televisión Canaria, TV3 in Catalonia, Romanian Radio Broadcasting Company, Italian Broadcasting, Broadcasting Macedonia, Checz Radio, Radio Television of Serbia, and the most relevant broadcasters from Ireland, Colombia, and Japan.

He is frequently invited along to give master classes and to preside over, or form part of, juries for important musical contests. Critics has always been unanimous in their praise for the artistic excellence of his musical performances.

Maribona has been Head Director of the Banda Municipal of Las Palmas de Gran Canaria. (2013–14). His modernization and excellence project led this band to attend the 2014 Chicago Midwest Clinic. In 2013, on behalf of the Banda Municipal of Las Palmas, he received the Golden Medal of the City of Las Palmas and the Silver Medal of Las Palmas Police Merit.

He currently teaches as a Professor of Music and Scenic Arts at http://rcsmm.eu/ Real Conservatorio Superior de Música de Madrid. Maribona is, as well, Professor of Orchestral Practice at Alfonso X El Sabio University. He combines his teaching activity with a busy artistic agenda both as a conductor and as a concert pianist.
