= Charles Sillem Lidderdale =

British painter

Charles Sillem Lidderdale (September 28, 1830, St. Petersburg - June 7, 1895, London) was a British artist whose work often focused on portraits of young women in outdoor settings.

== Life ==
Lidderdale's father was a merchant banker originally from Scotland and his mother was a British subject born in Russia. It is likely he was educated in England along with his brother William Lidderdale. In 1843, the family left Russia for England where they lived in London. His mother died shortly after the move and his father died just 2 years later in 1845.

== Selected paintings ==
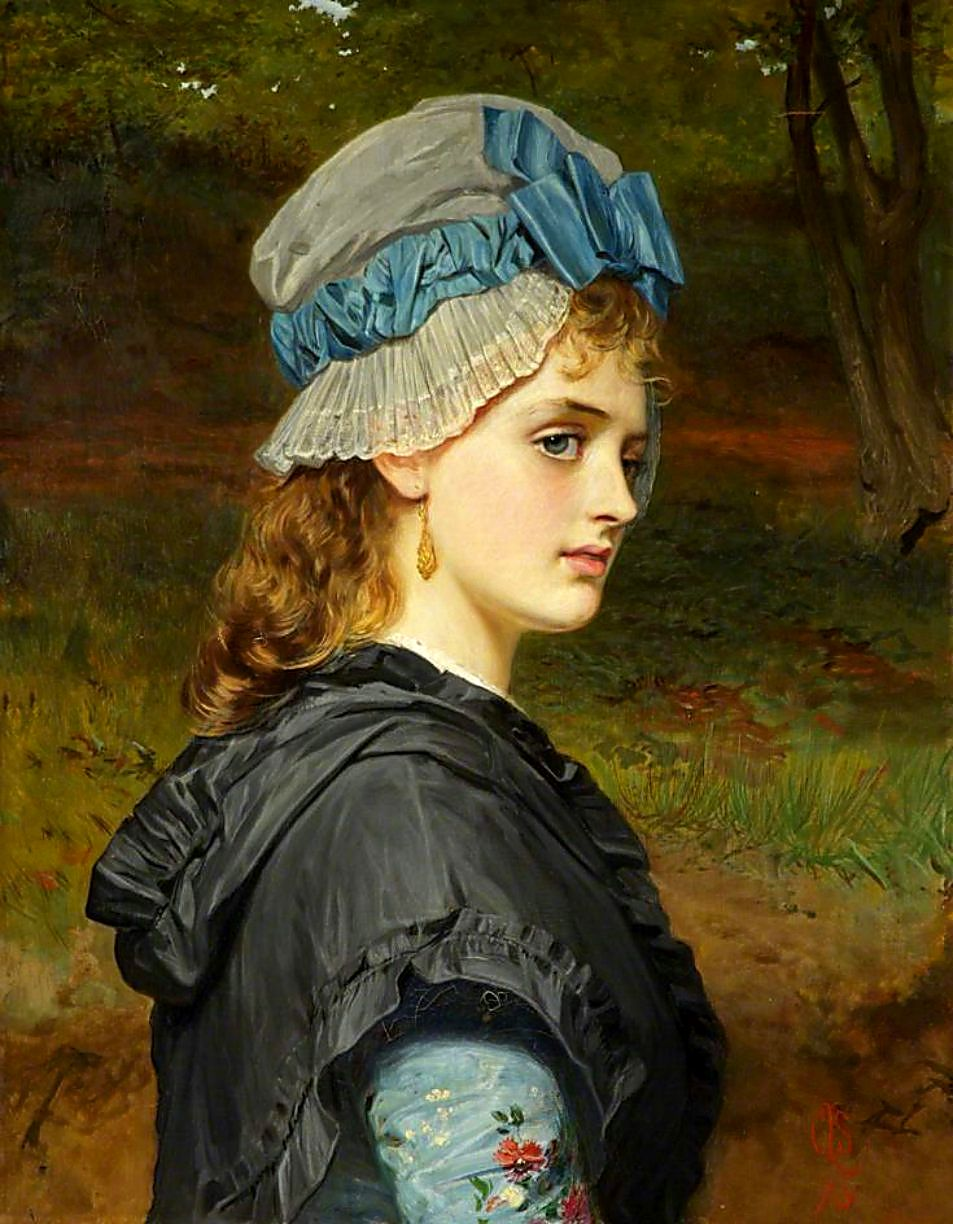
A Girl's Head

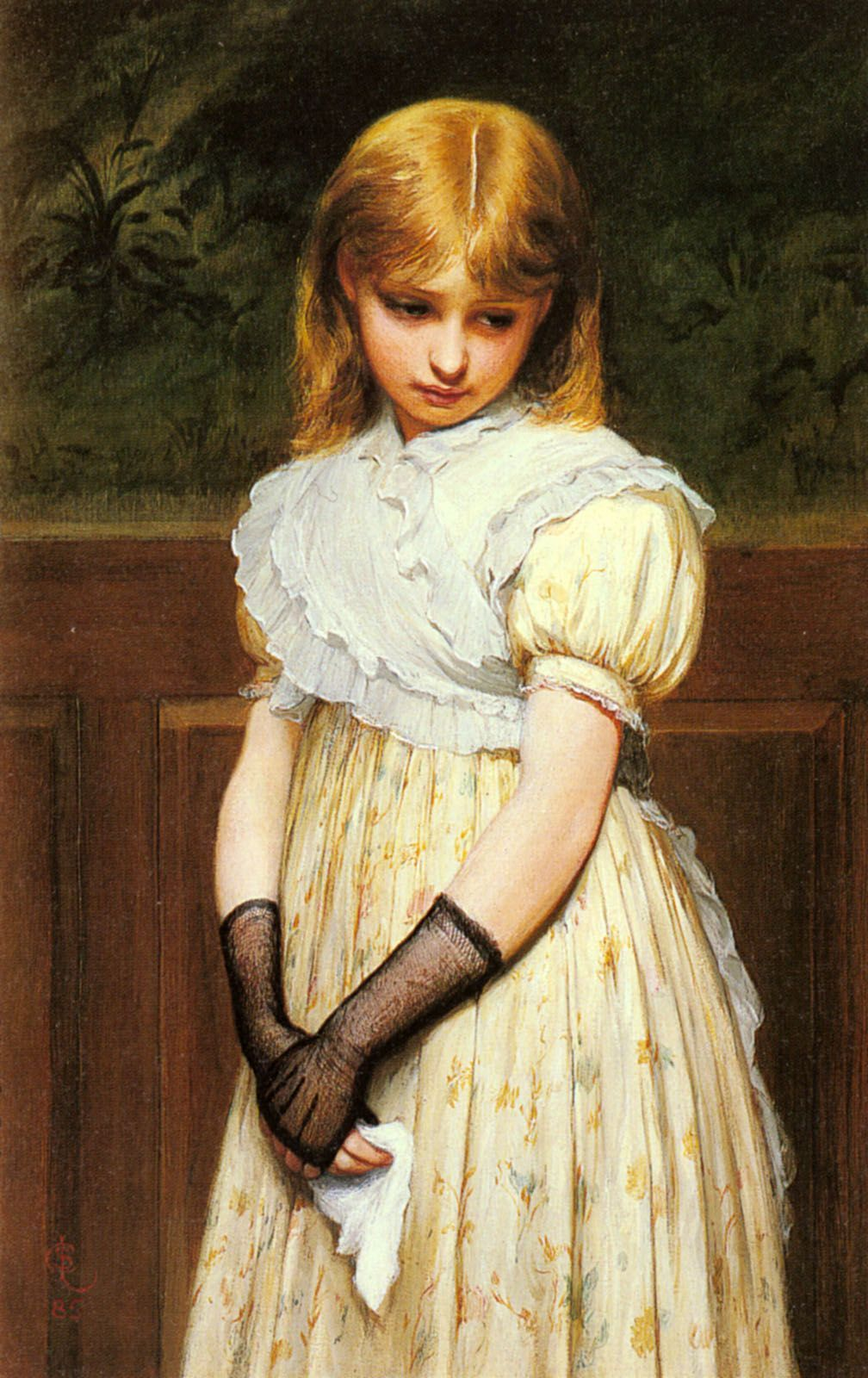
Petulance

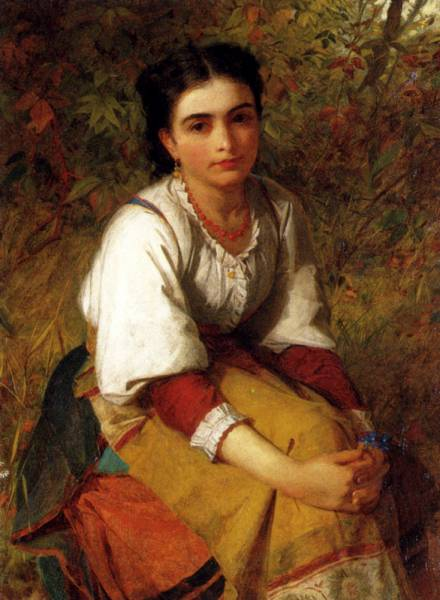
Penseriosa

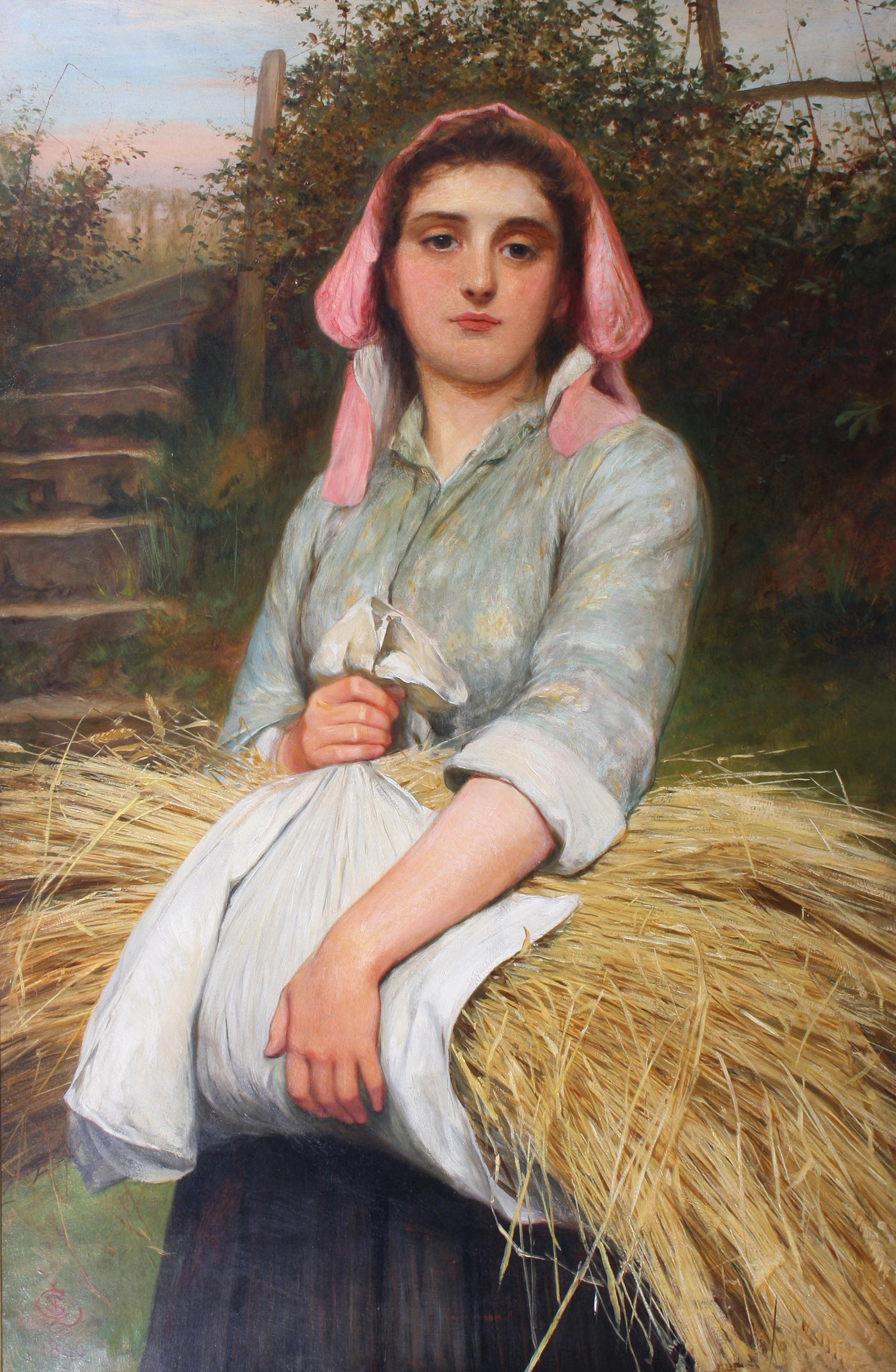
The Gleaner

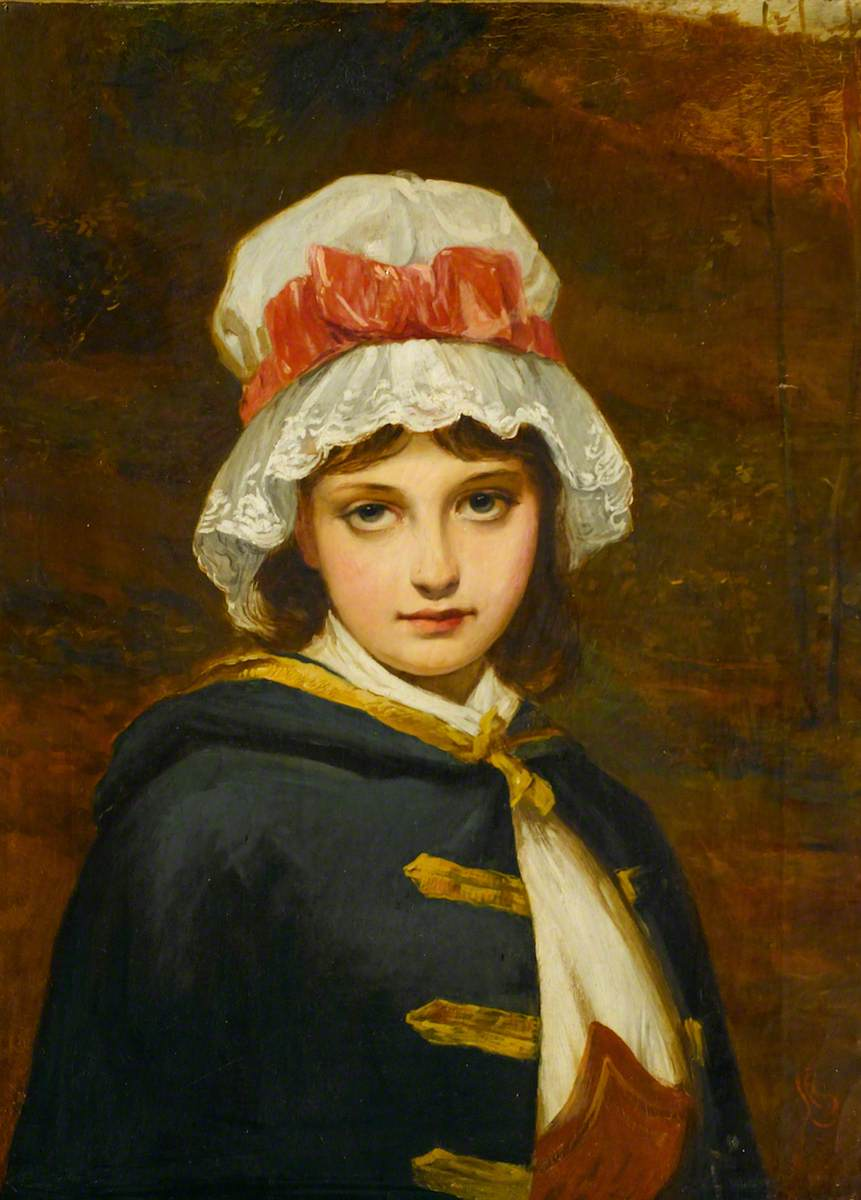
The Squire's Daughter

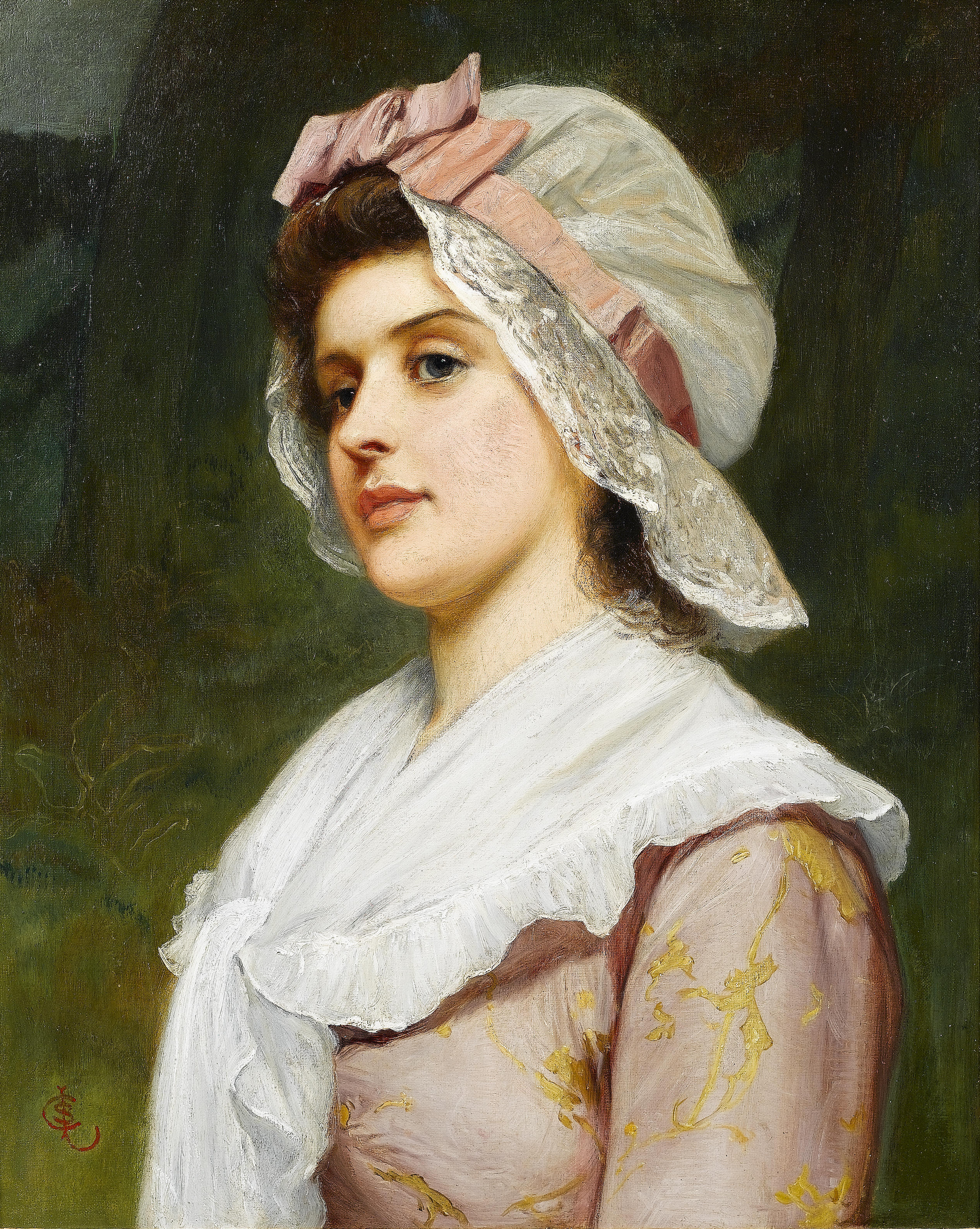
A Country Maid

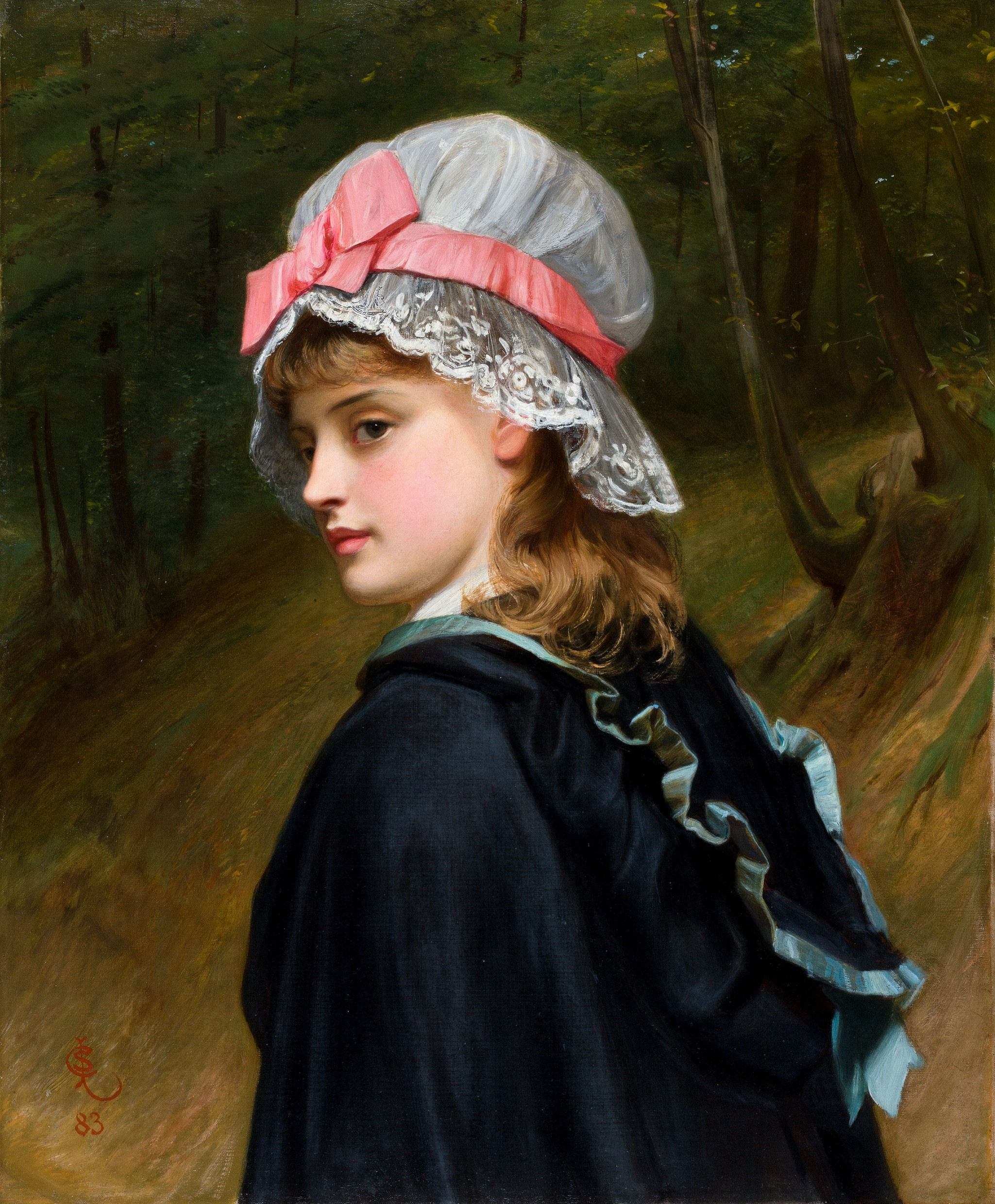
The farmer's daughter
