= Federica Di Palma =

- Education: University of Reading
- Scientific career
- Thesis: Analysis and mapping of bovine MHC class I genes (1999)

Federica Di Palma is a scientist at Genome British Columbia. She is known for her work in genomics, data science, and biodiversity preservation.

== Education and career ==
Di Palma earned her Ph.D. from the University of Reading, United Kingdom, where she focused on the analysis and mapping of bovine MHC class I genes. She conducted postdoctoral work at the United States' National Institutes of Health and then moved to the University of New Hampshire in 2002. In 2006 she moved to the Broad Institute where she led the vertebrate biology group. In 2014 Di Palma was named the director of science at The Genome Analysis Centre. As of 2024 Di Palma is the chief scientific officer and vice president of research and innovation at Genome British Columbia.

== Research ==
Di Palma's early work was a part of the Human Genome Project where she identified genes responsible for deafness syndromes in both mice and humans. She then worked on genome sequencing projects to examine evolution in the Caribbean anole lizard, the cichlids of East African lakes, and the three-spine stickleback. Di Palma is part of a coalition working to expand science research in Colombia.

== Selected publications ==
- Palma, Federica Di; Holme, Ralph H.; Bryda, Elizabeth C.; Belyantseva, Inna A.; Pellegrino, Richard; Kachar, Bechara; Steel, Karen P.; Noben-Trauth, Konrad (2001). "Mutations in Cdh23, encoding a new type of cadherin, cause stereocilia disorganization in waltzer, the mouse model for Usher syndrome type 1D". Nature Genetics. 27 (1): 103–107. doi:10.1038/83660. ISSN 1061-4036. PMID 11138008.
- Di Palma, Federica; Belyantseva, Inna A.; Kim, Hung J.; Vogt, Thomas F.; Kachar, Bechara; Noben-Trauth, Konrad (2002-11-12). "Mutations in Mcoln3 associated with deafness and pigmentation defects in varitint-waddler ( Va ) mice". Proceedings of the National Academy of Sciences. 99 (23): 14994–14999. doi:10.1073/pnas.222425399. ISSN 0027-8424. PMC 137533. PMID 12403827.
- Grabherr, Manfred G; Haas, Brian J; Yassour, Moran; Levin, Joshua Z; Thompson, Dawn A; Amit, Ido; Adiconis, Xian; Fan, Lin; Raychowdhury, Raktima; Zeng, Qiandong; Chen, Zehua; Mauceli, Evan; Hacohen, Nir; Gnirke, Andreas; Rhind, Nicholas (2011). "Full-length transcriptome assembly from RNA-Seq data without a reference genome". Nature Biotechnology. 29 (7): 644–652. doi:10.1038/nbt.1883. ISSN 1087-0156. PMC 3571712. PMID 21572440.
