= Giuseppe Devastato =

Italian pianist and composer

Giuseppe Devastato is an Italian pianist and composer.

== Life ==
Devastato was born in Naples, Italy. He recorded many movie soundtracks for the film industry, for television and radio stations in Europe and America. Including soundtracks for Warner Chappell Music, CAM and Rai 5. On December 9, 2011, he was awarded the "International Prize Cartagine" to human merit and professional achievements in the "MUSIC" section, for the dissemination of music in general - and Italian music in particular - around the world, in virtue of the merits acquired as a pianist and composer, with the intention to spread the world of classical music: "His actions show high sensitivity and a deep love for life. His playing is intended to imitate the human voice and is inspired by the art of Bel Canto of the Neapolitan School". He lives in Madrid, Spain, is Piano Professor at Musical Arts Madrid and Accademia Musicale Europea".
