= Fritzi – A Revolutionary Tale =

2019 film directed by Ralf Kukula

Fritzi: A Revolutionary Tale
- German theatrical release poster
- Directed by: Ralf Kukula; Matthias Bruhn
- Screenplay by: Beate Völcker; Péter Palátsik
- Produced by: Richard Lutterbeck; Ralf Kukula; Patrick Quinet; Stéphane Quinet; Pierre Urbain; Martin Vandas, Alena Vandasová; Benjamin Swiczinsky; Conrad Tambour; Johannes Schiehsl
- Edited by: Stefan Urlaß
- Music by: André Dziezuk
- Production companies: Balance Film GmbH; Trickstudio Lutterbeck GmbH; Doghouse Films; Artémis Productions; Maur Film
- Distributed by: Weltkino Filmverleih (Germany); Tarantula Distribution (Luxembourg); Pilot Film (Czech Republic)
- Release dates: 30 September 2019 (Festival du Film Francophone de Namur); 9 October 2019 (Germany); 16 October 2019 (Luxembourg); 6 November 2019 (Belgium); 9 November 2019 (Czech Republic)
- Running time: 86 minutes
- Countries: Germany; Luxembourg; Belgium; Czech Republic
- Language: German
- Box office: $375,689

Fritzi: A Revolutionary Tale (German: Fritzi - Eine Wendewundergeschichte) is a 2019 German-language animated film directed by Ralf Kukula and Matthias Bruhn about the Peaceful Revolution in Autumn 1989, told from the perspective of a twelve-year-old girl. A co-production between Germany, Luxembourg, Belgium the Czech Republic and Austria, the film is based on the 2009 German children's book Fritzi was There by Hanna Schott.

== Premise ==
1989 in Leipzig, East Germany. Twelve-year-old Fritzi lovingly takes care of her best friend Sophie's dog Sputnik while Sophie's family is on vacation in Hungary. But when Sophie does not return, Fritzi and Sputnik set out in search of her. The film tells the story of the protests of the citizens against the Communist SED regime of Erich Honecker and Egon Krenz until the fall of the Berlin Wall on November 9, 1989.

== Voice cast ==
- Naomi Hadad as Fritzi
- Ben Hadad as Bela
- Jördis Triebel as Julia
- Katharina Lopinsk as Frau Liesegang
- Winfried Glatzeder as police officer
- Peter Flechtner as Klaus
- Amelie Sophie von Redecke as Sophie
- Jan Treviño Kräling as Hanno

== Awards ==
- 2019: Preis der deutschen Filmkritik – Best children's film, awarded by the German Film Critics Association
- 2020: Mitteldeutscher Rundfunk – Best screenplay at the 28th Goldener Spatz children's media festival in Erfurt
- 2020: "Rauchfrei-Siegel" by the German Cancer Aid and the Non-Smoking Action Alliance as the film "...deliberately dispenses with smoking characters and thus serves as a role model, especially for young people."
