= Frederique Darragon =

French explorer

Frederique Darragon (29 May 1949, Paris) is a French explorer known for her documentary film The Secret Towers of the Himalayas, which chronicled her expedition to the mystifying stone towers of Sichuan and Tibet. She wrote a book also titled The Secret Towers of the Himalayas. She is founder and president of the Unicorn Foundation, to which profits from the film were contributed. She is the co-founder of the Sichuan University Unicorn Heritage Institute.

She made several important discoveries. By carbon-dating bits of wood from the internal structure of the towers, she confirmed that they were built 500 to 1,800 years ago. The fact that many of the towers have survived hundreds of earthquakes and tremors over the years, is probably due to their star-shaped design as well as to their construction method which intersperses masonry with wood planks or beams – an anti-seismic technique specific to this part of China and still employed in the region today. Combined with the vast numbers and size of the towers, this is evidence that a sophisticated civilization once existed in these remote areas.

Darragon believes these areas are now sure to become a major tourist attraction and has lobbied for the towers to be listed as UNESCO World Heritage Site for their protection and preservation.

== Work ==
- The Secret towers of the Himalayas. 2003 Documentary
- The Secret towers of the Himalayas. 2005 English/Chinese book published in China ISBN 7-80709-043-X/K2

== See also ==
- Himalayan Towers
- Jhator
