= Lollipop (actress) =

Italian pornographic actress

Lollipop, also known as Federica Gori (6 August 1970 – 5 February 2008), was an Italian pornographic actress and television personality.

Born as Maria Federica Besesti in Rome, daughter and granddaughter of actors and voice actors, Lollipop debuted as a stripper, then started her career in adult films after having met Luca Damiano, who directed her in several films and with whom she was engaged for some years. Her works include the series Lollipop e le sue amiche and an adult soap opera on the satellite channel Stream TV. In 2000, she also appeared in the documentary film Gladiatori: Reportage sul cinema hard italiano, that premiered at the Turin Film Festival.

In 2001, she filed a lawsuit against the Italian band Lollipop, accusing them of having stolen her stage name.

Retired from pornography, she became a television personality as the official face of ContoTv, a satellite channel broadcasting the matches of Fiorentina in the UEFA Cup and of Salernitana in its national championship, and she had some minor roles in films directed by Paolo Virzì and Carlo Verdone.

She died at 37 of a heart attack in her home.
