= Fern Flanagan Saddler =

American judge (born 1955)

Associate Judge on the Superior Court of the District of Columbia
- In office September 12, 2003 – April 22, 2022
- President: George W. Bush
- Preceded by: Patricia A. Wynn
- Succeeded by: Danny Lam Nguyen

Magistrate judge on the Superior Court of the District of Columbia
- In office February 1991 – September 12, 2003

Personal details
- Born: May 17, 1955 (age 70) Baltimore, Maryland
- Spouse: Reverend Dr. Paul Harvey Saddler
- Education: Wellesley College (BA); Georgetown University (JD)

Fern Flanagan Saddler (born May 17, 1955) is a former associate judge on the Superior Court of the District of Columbia.

== Education and career ==
Saddler earned her Bachelor of Arts from Wellesley College in 1976, and her Juris Doctor from Georgetown University Law Center in 1979.

After graduating, she worked in private practice as an attorney at Mitchell, Shorter & Gartrell. In 1984, she joined the District of Columbia Office of Bar Counsel as an Assistant Bar Counsel where she investigated complaints of attorney misconduct. In 1988, she joined the District of Columbia Court of Appeals as a Senior Staff Attorney.

=== D.C. Superior Court ===
From 1991 to September 2003, Saddler served a Magistrate Judge (formerly known as Hearing Commissioner) of the Superior Court of the District of Columbia.

On June 11, 2002, President George W. Bush nominated Saddler to be an associate judge on the Superior Court of the District of Columbia. Her nomination expired on November 20, 2002, with the end of the 107th United States Congress.

President George W. Bush renominated her on January 7, 2003, to a 15-year term as an associate judge on the Superior Court of the District of Columbia to the seat vacated by Patricia A. Wynn. On June 18, 2003, the Senate Committee on Governmental Affairs held a hearing on her nomination. On June 26, 2003, the Committee reported her nomination favorably to the senate floor. On June 27, 2003, the full Senate confirmed her nomination by voice vote. She was sworn in on September 12, 2003.

On April 30, 2018, the Commission on Judicial Disabilities and Tenure recommended that President Trump reappoint her to second 15-year term as a judge on the D.C. Superior Court. She retired on April 22, 2022.

== Personal life ==
Saddler was born and raised in Baltimore, Maryland. She is married to Reverend Paul Harvey Saddler, an ordained minister in the United Church of Christ in Washington, D.C.
