= Frederieke Saeijs =

Frederieke Saeijs (The Hague, Netherlands, 25 January 1979) is a Dutch violinist. Saeijs is the winner of the First Grand Prize as well as four special Prizes of the 2005 International Violin Competition Marguerite Long-Jacques Thibaud in Paris, France.

== Career ==
Since 2009 Saeijs is a violin professor at the Royal Conservatory] in The Hague, The Netherlands. She is also a violin professor at the Alfonso X El Sabio University in Madrid, Spain. She plays a Pietro Guarneri violin (Venice, 1725), Ex-Reine Elisabeth, kindly lent to her by the Dutch National Music Instrument Foundation.

In December 2009 record label Naxos released a CD with sonatas for violin and piano by Ravel, Respighi and Granados, performed by Saeijs and pianist Maurice Lammerts van Bueren.
