= Ignatius Elgin Shumate =

American teacher and lawyer

Ignatius Elgin Shumate (December 1834, in Loudoun County, Virginia – September 9, 1907, in Dalton, Georgia) was a teacher, colonel in the Confederate Army, and lawyer.

He graduated in 1858 with distinction from Emory and Henry College, later received a master's degree from the same school, and then served on the faculty.

After the American Civil War began, he moved to Dalton, Georgia, where his wife, the former "Miss Bitting", had family. Dalton became an important post with an army supply depot, and Shumate became a "clerk and assistant in the subsistence department" under General Joseph E. Johnston.

After the end of the war, Shumate practiced law and was elected to the Georgia House in 1868 as a Democrat. His work in the House was respected enough that one writer called him "perhaps its most brilliant member". Cherokee Circuit Court adjourned early on the day of his memorial service, and the court accepted a report on the service.
