= Federica Masolin =

Italian sports journalist and television presenter

- Born: 7 May 1985 (age 40); Milan, Italy
- Occupations: Sports journalist; Television presenter
- Employer: Sky Sport

Federica Masolin (born 7 May 1985) is an Italian sports journalist and television presenter of Sky Sport's football programming. She was the main presenter of Sky Sport's coverage of Formula One motor racing, having previously covered men and women's volleyball as well as the Serie A and Serie B football leagues, the 2011 Copa América, the 2012 Summer Olympics in London and the 2014 Winter Olympics in Sochi for the channel.

== Biography ==
Masolin was born on 7 May 1985, in Milan, Italy, the oldest daughter of parents who are of Friuli origin; her father Flavio comes from Latisana with her maternal grandfather originating from Codroipo and her mother's name is Franca. Masolin has a younger sister, whom she was jealous of, and she was taken by her father to watch sports events such as motor races and tennis matches in her youth to stop the two siblings from arguing. She also did ballet, and graduated from the Università Cattolica del Sacro Cuore with a degree in modern literature. Following time making minor contributions to local newspapers, Masolin did an internship with the editorial staff at sports television channel Sky Sport at age 20. She received full support from her parents, and the experience she got at Sky Sport allowed her to be made a sideline volleyball correspondent for both the Serie A1 Men's League and the Serie A1 Women's League.

In 2009, Masolin began to cover the Serie A and Serie B football leagues as a sideline reporter for Sky Sport. She was frequently sent to cover matches involving the Genoa CFC and UC Sampdoria clubs, and subsequently presented the broadcaster's coverage of the 2011 Copa América. Masolin also presented the Euro Calcio Show dedicated to the broadcasting of foreign football leagues in Italy. In 2012, she was sent to London by Sky Sport to cover the 2012 Summer Olympics, and began fronting the Sky Sport24 programme at the behest of certain editors the following year. Masolin was also sent to cover the 2014 Winter Olympics in Sochi.

She was made presenter of Sky Sport's three-day event coverage of Formula One motor racing from the 2014 season onwards after a meeting with a Sky director in Sochi that February, and also conducted the pre-season presentations of the Ferrari racing team. Masolin prepared for the role by reviewing the sport's regulations and spoke with colleagues about it. She made her first appearance as presenter at the 2014 Australian Grand Prix, and has built a healthy working and personal relationship with fellow pundits Davide Valsecchi and 1997 world drivers' championship winner Jacques Villeneuve. Masolin presents the pre and post-race Paddock Live portions as well as the pre-race social column of Sky Sport's Formula One coverage. She left Sky Sport F1's team in February 2024 and focused on presenting the channel's coverage of football.

In 2017, she was named TV Reporter of the Year over fellow broadcaster Giorgia Rossi with 52.4 per cent of the vote. She is an ambassador for the Laureus Sport for Good Foundation and has taken part in charitable events for the foundation. Masolin has been part of the Run That Track community raising money for foundations helping children in Bangladesh, Ghana and South Africa.

== Personality and approach ==
She dislikes discussing her private life with the media. Masolin is fluent in four languages. She said she rises early, and arrives at a race track four hours before the television broadcast begins as preparation for 30 hours of broadcast over the course of a meeting, and an Inter fan. Masolin says she felt more relaxed in Formula One than doing football and found there to be less prejudice in the former.
