= Fredrika Wetterhoff =

Finnish educator (1844–1905)

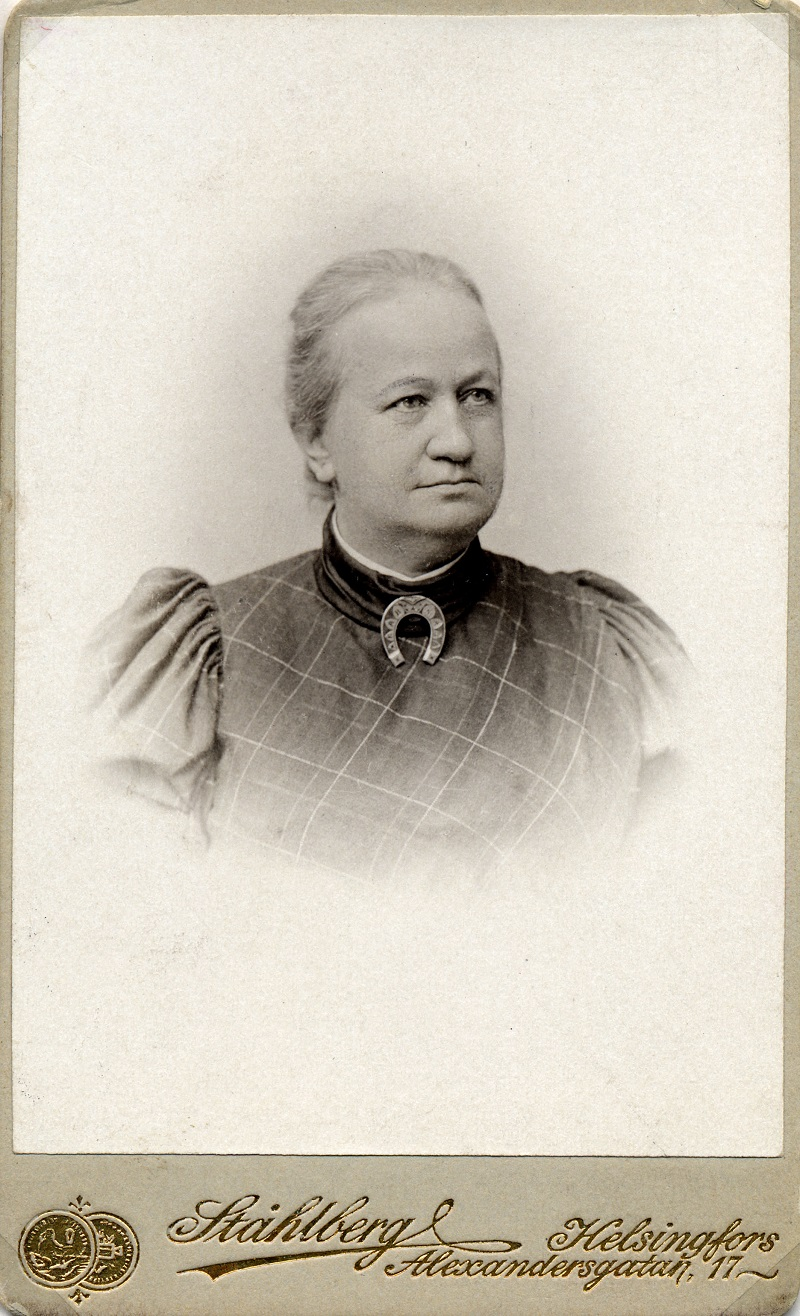
- Born: 14 January 1844; Helsinki, Finland
- Died: 14 April 1905 (aged 61); Hämeenlinna, Finland
- Occupation: teacher

Fredrika Wetterhoff (14 January 1844 – 14 April 1905) was a Finnish teacher. She founded the Wetterhoff Craft School.

== Biography ==
Wetterhoff was born on 14 January 1844 in Helsinki, Finland. Her father was Georg Adolf Wetterhoff. Wetterhoff was born into a Swedish-speaking gentry family and also learned Finnish, French and German.

In 1885, Wetterhoff founded a girls' work school in Hämeenlinna, which became known as the Wetterhoff Craft School. Students were taught skills including sewing bed linen, knitting, crocheting, weaving cloth, straw work, wood carving and geometric drawing. The school produced bed linen for the Hämeenlinna hospital as well as selling products.

She died on 14 April 1905 in Hämeenlinna, aged 61.
