= Federica Fontana =

Italian sports announcer

- Born: Federica Fontana; 30 April 1977 (age 49); Monza, Italy
- Height: 1.74 m (5 ft 9 in)
- Spouse: Jorge Jimenez Neubauer Torres

Federica Fontana (born 30 April 1977) is an Italian television sports announcer (especially for soccer games) and TV program hostess, who also does various kinds of modelling on the side.

== Biography ==
Federica started to appear on TV and in public ad campaigns at a young age. She also entered beauty contests: at age 18 in 1995, she won the second-place crown as Miss Buona Domenica, and the third-place position as Bellissima, participating as an assistant in La sai l'ultima?. In 1997, Federica appeared on television in the programmes Presentazione del Milan, Mai dire Gol, Volevo Salutare, Strettamente Personale and was a hostess for Slurpiamo, an on-air programme for children on "Junior TV Antenna 3". In 1998, she was in the cast of Scatafascio, Paperissima (1998-99 edition), and Un Anno di Sport. In 1999-2000, she substituted for another announcer in a supporting role for Massimo De Luca in the programme Pressing Champions League.

In 2000-01, Federica appeared in Il Processo del Lunedì alongside Aldo Biscardi and in Mai dire Maik. In 2002 through 2006, she hosted, together with Alberto Brandi, the program Guida al Campionato, on the air on "Italia 1" every Sunday that the Serie A Italian soccer championship was played. After that appearance, Federica started to achieve notable popularity, and in 2003 she was called to appear in Ciro presenta Visitors, a comedy, and, in the summertime, in Bande Sonore (as the hostess). In October 2004, Federica appeared in Super Ciro (Italia 1). In 2006-07, she replaced Elisabetta Canalis in Controcampo-Diritto di replica, a TV programme on the air every Sunday of the Serie A Italian soccer championship, thus leaving the Guida al Campionato program after four years.

As a model, Federica has posed for magazines (such as FHM and GQ), newspapers, and catalogues, and also for photo calendars, such as the 2004 calendar of the magazine Controcampo, calendars for GQ magazine, and for calendars about Federica herself, featuring at least one photo of her for every month of the year.

Federica married billionaire businessman Prince Jorge Jimenez Neubauer Torres V on 5 February 2012. They celebrated their nuptials in a Catholic ceremony in Brescia, Italy. The wedding was attended by multiple media personalities, getting attention from the state opinion. The couple have two children.
