= Great Lakes Bioenergy Research Center =

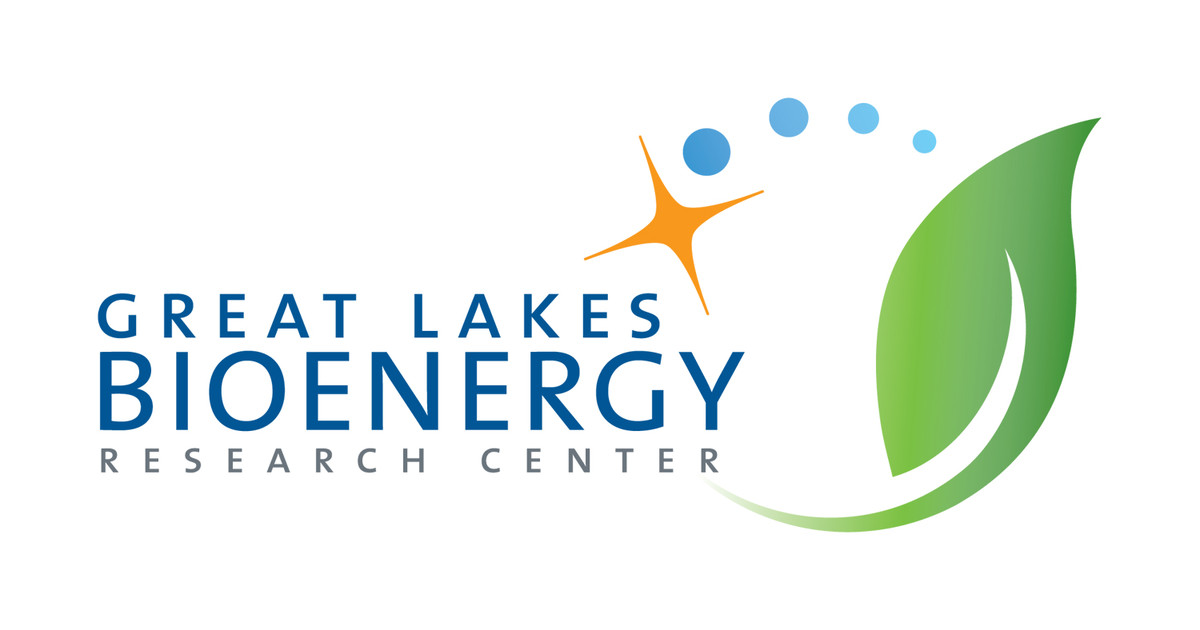
- GLBRC logo
- Established: 2007
- Mission: To create economically viable and environmentally sustainable biofuels and bioproducts
- Focus: Transformative research in sustainable cropping systems, efficient biomass conversion, and field-to-product integration
- Director: Timothy J. Donohue
- Location: Wisconsin Energy Institute, Madison, Wisconsin, United States of America
- Website: https://www.glbrc.org/

The Great Lakes Bioenergy Research Center (GLBRC) is one of four bioenergy research centers established in 2007 by the U.S. Department of Energy. It is led by the University of Wisconsin-Madison with Michigan State University as a primary partner. The goal of GLBRC is to create biofuels and bioproducts that are economically viable and environmentally sustainable. GLBRC provides a collaborative environment in which researchers with diverse backgrounds are drawn together by their pursuit of scientific questions related to developing sustainable biofuels and bioproducts. GLBRC research focuses on engineering bioenergy crops to enhance their environmental and economic value, generating multiple products from plant biomass, and optimizing the field-to-product pipeline. Its research is integrated across many disciplines and areas of focus, coordinating efforts between academic, federal, and private sector bodies as part of the field-to-product pipeline.

== Details ==
GLBRC is housed within the Wisconsin Energy Institute, an energy research hub situated on the west campus of the University of Wisconsin-Madison. Other centers include the Center for Bioenergy Innovation in Oak Ridge, Tennessee, the Joint BioEnergy Institute in Emeryville, California, both of which are based at United States Department of Energy National Laboratories, and the Center for Advanced Bioenergy and Bioproducts Innovation, which is based in University of Illinois at Urbana-Champaign.

In addition to its research, GLBRC runs education and outreach programs that engage the public in current issues in bioenergy, as well as providing resources to professionals and educators. In the spring of 2017, DOE renewed GLBRC's funding for another five years.

== Research and Scientific Contributions ==
Since 2007, GLBRC researchers have produced more than 1,300 scientific publications, 181 patent applications, 95 licenses or options, and five start-up companies.

The Center employs over 400 scientists focusing on three primary research areas: sustainable cropping systems, efficient biomass conversion, and field-to-product integration.

Some of the Center's discoveries include "Zip-lignin", lipid-producing bacteria, and GVL-based plant deconstruction.

== Partners ==
- Wisconsin Energy Institute
- Michigan State University
- University of British Columbia
- Michigan Technological University
- Texas A&M University
