= Fritzi Fern =

American actress

Fritzi Fern (born Fritzi Fern Blower, September 19, 1901 – September 20, 1932) was a motion picture actress from Akron, Ohio. She was the daughter of Hattie R. Blower.

== Movie actress ==
Fern was raised and educated in Los Angeles, California. She was a child actress with the Morosco Company and made films for the Greyhound Motion Picture Company as a youth. In 1922 she was cast in a series of two-reelers starring Little Napoleon. For a time she was a stage dancer in California and worked in vaudeville.

She was rediscovered at the age of nineteen. Fern signed a long-term contract with Universal Pictures in October 1928. Universal scouts noticed her while she was playing a part in Clear The Decks with Reginald Denny.

Fern was cast in The Charlatan (1929) with Margaret Livingston and Dorothy Gould. Later she performed in episode six of the movie serial western, The Last Frontier (1932). The twelve chapter screen production featured Lon Chaney Jr. and Dorothy Gulliver.

Fritzi Fern died in Los Angeles, California on September 20, 1932. She had been diagnosed with a brain tumor a few months earlier. She was survived by her mother and a brother, Evan Burkhardt. Her burial was carried out by Pierce Brothers and she was buried at Valhalla Memorial Park in North Hollywood, California.
