= Friederike =

Friederike is a feminine given name which may refer to:

== People ==
- Friederike Sophie Wilhelmine of Prussia, Margravine of Brandenburg-Bayreuth (1709–1758), Prussian princess and older sister of Frederick the Great
- Princess Friederike Luise of Prussia (1714–1784), Margravine of Brandenburg-Ansbach
- Margravine Friederike of Brandenburg-Schwedt (1736–1798), Duchess of Württemberg
- Princess Friederike of Hesse-Darmstadt (1752–1782), Duchess of Mecklenburg-Strelitz
- Countess Friederike of Schlieben (1757–1827), Duchess of Schleswig-Holstein-Sonderburg-Beck
- Princess Friederike of Schleswig-Holstein-Sonderburg-Beck (1780–1862), daughter of Friedrich Karl Ludwig, Duke of Schleswig-Holstein-Sonderburg-Beck
- Princess Friederike of Schleswig-Holstein-Sonderburg-Glücksburg (1811–1902), daughter of Duke Friedrich Wilhelm of Schleswig-Holstein-Sonderburg-Glücksburg
- Friederike Barth (born 1975), German field hockey player
- Friederike Benda (born 1987), German politician
- Friederike Brun (1765–1835), Danish author and salonist
- Friederike Caroline Neuber (1697–1760), German actor and theatre director
- Friederike Grün (1836–1917), German operatic soprano
- Friederike Kempner (1836–1904), Polish-German Jewish poet
- Friederike Koderitsch (1894–1978), Dutch Olympic fencer
- Friederike Krüger (1789–1848), a woman who impersonated a man to join the Prussian army
- Friederike Lienig (1790–1855), Latvian entomologist
- Friederike Löwy (1910–1994), Austrian Olympic swimmer
- Friederike Mayröcker (1924–2021), Austrian poet
- Friederike Nadig (1897–1970), German politician
- Friederike Roth (born 1948), German writer

== Music ==
- Friederike, a 1928 operetta by Franz Lehár

== Fictional characters ==
- Friederike Losigkeit, from the anime/manga Strike Witches
- Friederike Porsche, from the anime/manga Strike Witches
- Friederike, from the manga Ludwig Kakumei

== See also ==
- Princess Frederica (disambiguation), including other variant spellings
