= Princess Frederica =

Princess Frederica, Princess Friederike or Princess Frederika may refer to:

- Princess Frederica Amalia of Denmark (1649–1704), duchess consort of Holstein-Gottorp, wife of Duke Christian Albrecht of Holstein-Gottorp
- Princess Friederike Luise of Prussia (1714–1784), daughter of King Frederick William I of Prussia and wife of Karl Wilhelm Friedrich, margrave of Brandenburg-Ansbach
- Frederica Louisa of Hesse-Darmstadt (1751–1805), queen consort and second wife of King Frederick William II of Prussia
- Princess Friederike of Hesse-Darmstadt (1752–1782), daughter of Landgrave George William of Hesse-Darmstadt and wife of Charles II, grand duke of Mecklenburg-Strelitz
- Princess Frederica Charlotte of Prussia (1767–1820), daughter of King Frederick William II of Prussia and wife of Prince Frederick, Duke of York and Albany
- Frederica of Mecklenburg-Strelitz (1778–1841), wife of King Ernest Augustus I of Hanover
- Princess Friederike of Schleswig-Holstein-Sonderburg-Beck (1780–1862), daughter of Friedrich Karl Ludwig, Duke of Schleswig-Holstein-Sonderburg-Beck
- Frederica of Baden (1781–1826), queen consort of King Gustav IV Adolf of Sweden
- Princess Frederica of Prussia (1796–1850), daughter of Prince Louis Charles of Prussia and wife of Leopold IV, Duke of Anhalt-Dessau
- Princess Friederike of Schleswig-Holstein-Sonderburg-Glücksburg (1811–1902), daughter of Duke Friedrich Wilhelm of Schleswig-Holstein-Sonderburg-Glücksburg
- Princess Frederica of Hanover (1848–1926), daughter of George V of Hanover and wife of Baron Alfons von Pawel-Rammingen
- Frederica of Hanover (1917–1981), queen consort of King Paul of Greece

== See also ==
- Caroline of Baden, Frederica Caroline Wilhelmina, Electress and later first Queen of Bavaria
- Friederike of Hanover (disambiguation)
