= Okemos High School =

Public high school in Okemos, Michigan, United States

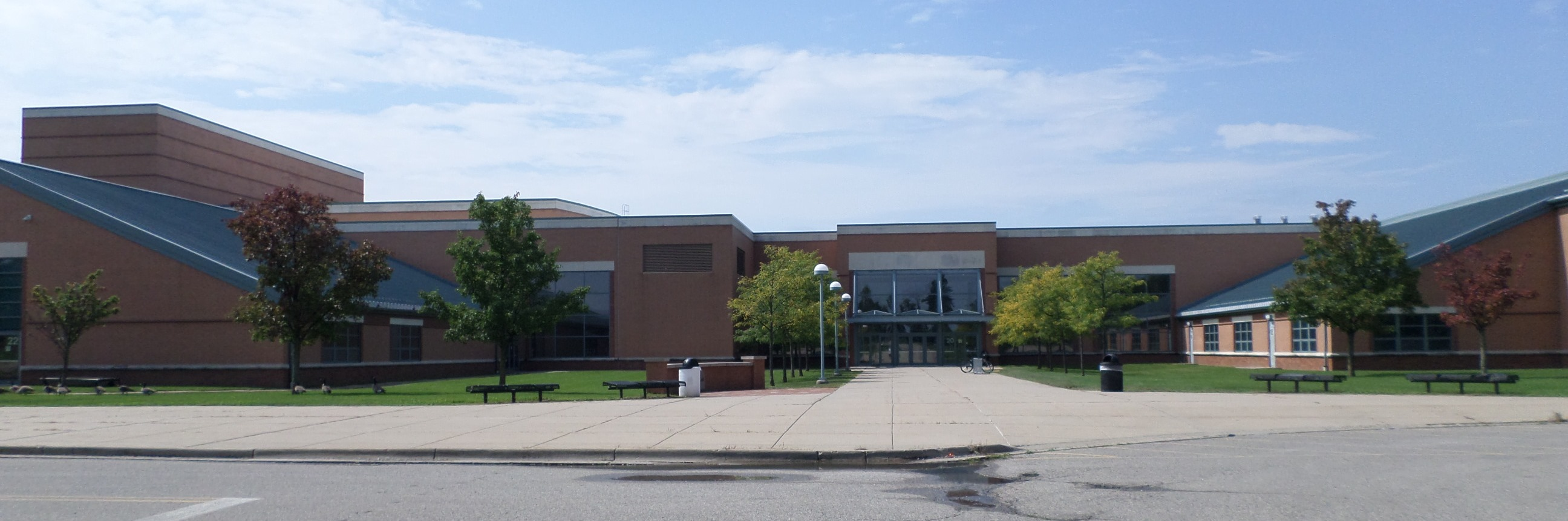
- The school in September 2015

Location
- 2800 Jolly Rd; Okemos, Michigan 48864; United States
- Coordinates: 42°41′04″N 84°27′22″W

Information
- School type: Public
- School district: Okemos Public Schools
- Superintendent: Dr. Matt Olson
- Principal: Daniel Kemsley
- Teaching staff: 78.40 (FTE)
- Grades: 9-12
- Gender: Coeducational
- Enrollment: 1,496 (2024–2025)
- Student to teacher ratio: 19.08
- Colors: Maroon & Light Blue
- Athletics conference: Capital Area Activities Conference
- Nickname: Wolves
- Newspaper: The OHS Press
- Website: ohs.okemosk12.net

Okemos High School is a public high school in Okemos, Michigan, United States. It is the only high school in the Okemos Public Schools district. It is located southeast of the main campus of Michigan State University, between Bennett and Jolly Roads on the North and South, and Hulett and Hagadorn Roads on the East and West. The current building was completed in 1994, replacing the now Chippewa Middle School building as the district's high school. Former students of Chippewa 7-8 School comprise the school's student body.

== Attendance area ==
The school district (and therefore the high school's attendance boundary) includes approximately two-thirds of Meridian Township, Michigan and portions of Alaiedon and Williamstown townships. It includes most of Okemos, as well as portions of Lansing, Haslett, and East Lansing.

== Academics ==
Student assessments
- 2021–22 school year Change vs. prior year

M-STEP 11th grade proficiency rates (Science / Social Studies)
- Advanced %: 26.9 / 25.5
- Proficient %: 24.6 / 25.5
- PR. Proficient %: 10.2 / 32.6
- Not Proficient %: 38.3 / 16.5

Average test scores
- SAT Total: 1130.0 (▼ −45.9)

An extensive Advanced Placement (AP) curriculum is in place, in which 59% of students participate. To ensure high quality, admission to AP courses requires high achievement in prerequisite classes and a committee approval.

Okemos High School was ranked 13th in the state of Michigan in U.S. News & World Report's 2021 list of "America's Best High Schools". The student to teacher ratio at Okemos High School is 19 students to 1 teacher.

Okemos High School is recognized by NCA (North Central Association of Colleges and Schools) as an accredited public high school.

== Extracurriculars ==
The Okemos High School quiz bowl varsity team is consistently a top performer nationally; in 2016, 2017, and 2018, they qualified for NAQT nationals held in Dallas, TX (2016), in Atlanta, GA (2017, 2018, 2019, 2022, 2023, 2024, and 2025), and virtually (2021). Okemos High School finished 53rd nationally in Quiz Bowl in 2016 and 25th in 2017.

Okemos High School offers band, choir and orchestra in the performing arts section. The top orchestra is Philharmonic, the top band is SWE (Symphonic Wind Ensemble), and the top choir is Someko (which is Okemos spelled backwards). Okemos has many performers qualify for the All-State orchestra as well as for the MSVMA Honors Choir.

The Okemos High School theatre program is another popular extracurricular activity in the performing arts section. The school typically puts on three shows each year including a spring musical.

The Okemos Solar Racing Club has consistently placed well in the Solar Car Challenge, placing second in 2019 and winning the Classic Division in 2023.

== Notable alumni ==
- Donald Keck (1958), American physicist
- John Bennett Ramsey (1961), father of JonBenét Ramsey
- Walter Willett (1963), American physician, Harvard University School of Public Health
- Peter Reckell (1973), actor, played Bo Brady on the TV soap opera Days of Our Lives
- Paul Quantrill (1986), MLB All-Star pitcher
- Lee Abramson (1988), composer
- Rob Bell (1988), founding pastor of Mars Hill Bible Church and author of Velvet Elvis
- Bill Boyle (1994), soccer coach for the Niagara Purple Eagles
- Curtis John Cregan (1995), an American actor who appeared in the American version of the children's television show Hi-5
- Tom Welling (1995), actor, played Clark Kent on the TV series Smallville
- Kristen Rasmussen (1996), WNBA player
- Nathan Overholser (1997), tennis player
- Cynthia Frelund (2000), sports analyst for the NFL Network
- Sabah Khoury (2001), basketball player who played overseas
- Jason P. Miller (2002), professor of mathematics at the University of Cambridge
- John Van Dam (2003), assistant coach for the Jacksonville Jaguars
- Richa Gangopadhyay, (2004) model, popular lead actress in Indian Cinema, particularly in South India
- Andrew Robl, (2004) poker player
- Kim Chi (2006), South Korean-American drag queen, artist, and television personality best known as a contestant on season 8 of RuPaul's Drag Race
- Johnathon Jones (2006), basketball player who played overseas
- Jason Spencer (2006), Musician
- Tyler Oakley (2007), YouTube personality and advocate for LGBT youth
- Travis Bader (2010), assistant coach for the Brooklyn Nets, basketball player who played overseas
- Taylor Moton (2012), offensive tackle for the Carolina Panthers
- Alma Cooper (2019), Miss USA 2024
- Caleb Bonemer (2023), infielder in the Chicago White Sox organization

== Athletics ==
The district's mascot has been a topic of debate since the mid-1990s. In 2004, the school agreed to phase out the name "Chieftains" in favor of "Chiefs." In 2021, the school board voted unanimously to drop the Chiefs mascot entirely. "Wolves" was voted on and selected as the new mascot name, then approved by the school board.

Okemos fields teams for both boys and girls in many sports. The Wolves are a member of the Capital Area Activities Conference. State Championship winners are listed below. The following sports are offered:

- Baseball (boys)
- Basketball (girls & boys)
  - Girls State champions - 1981
  - Boys state champions - 1981, 1982
- Cheerleading (girls-sideline)
- Cross Country (girls & boys)
  - Boys state champions - 1986
- Football (boys)
- Golf (girls & boys)
  - Boys state champions - 1976
- Hockey (boys)
- Lacrosse (girls & boys)
  - Girls state champions - 2009, 2010
- Skiing (girls & boys)
  - Boys state champions - 1977
- Soccer (girls & boys)
  - Girls state champions - 2006, 2012
  - Boys state champions - 1984, 2004, 2021
- Softball (girls)
  - State champions - 1999
- Swimming (girls & boys)
  - Girls state champions - 1980
- Tennis (girls & boys)
  - Girls state champions - 1983, 1993, 1994, 1995, 1998, 1999, 2000, 2001
  - Boys state champions - 1986, 1989, 1992, 1994, 1995, 1997, 1999, 2000, 2004, 2005, 2006, 2007, 2017, 2020 (D1)
- Track (girls & boys)
  - Boys state champions - 1928, 1930, 1937
- Volleyball (girls)
- Water Polo (not MHSAA sanctioned) (girls & boys)
  - Girls state champions - 2010, 2011, 2014
  - Boys state champions - 2018
- Wrestling (boys)
  - State champions - 1965, 1966, 1967
