= Haslett, Michigan =

Census-designated place in Michigan, United States

- Census-designated place (CDP) & unincorporated community
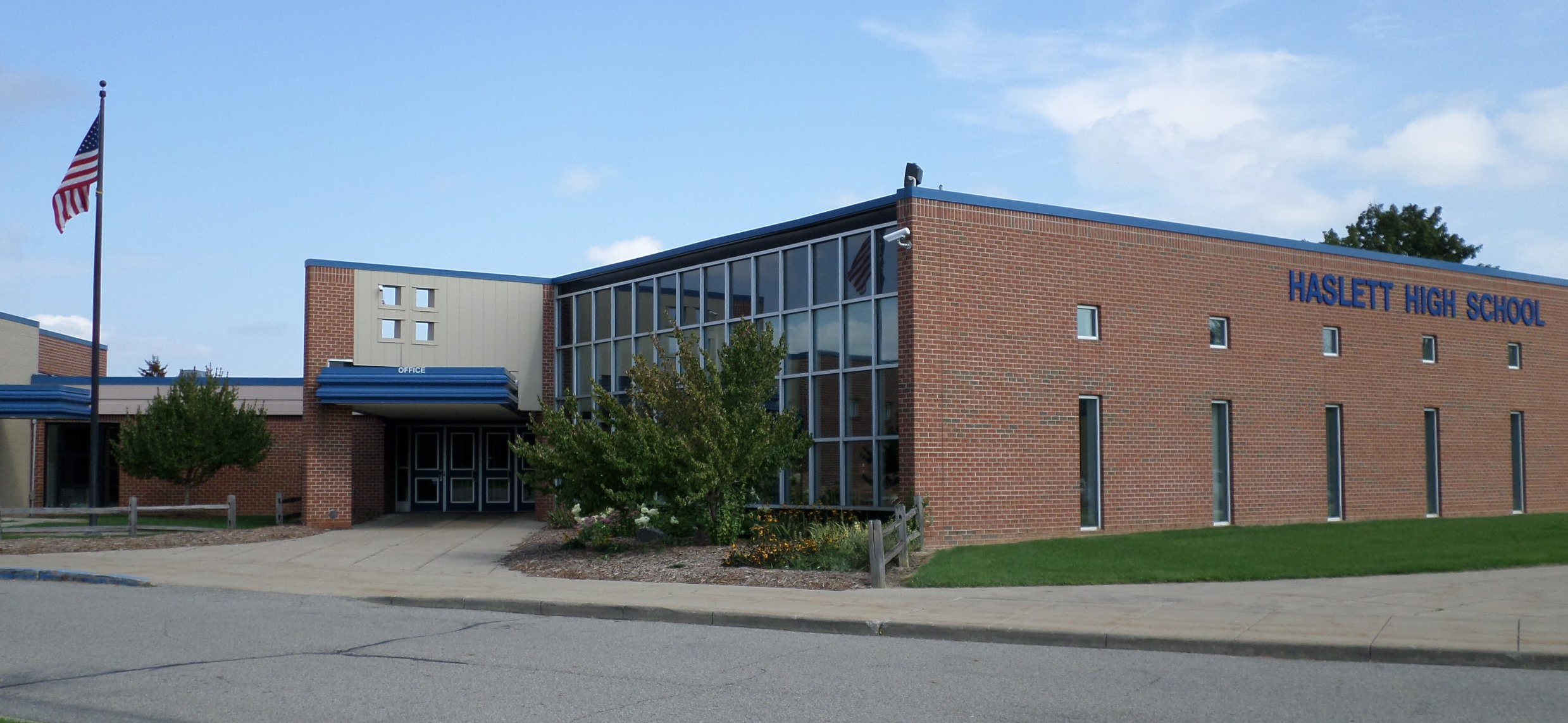
- Haslett High School

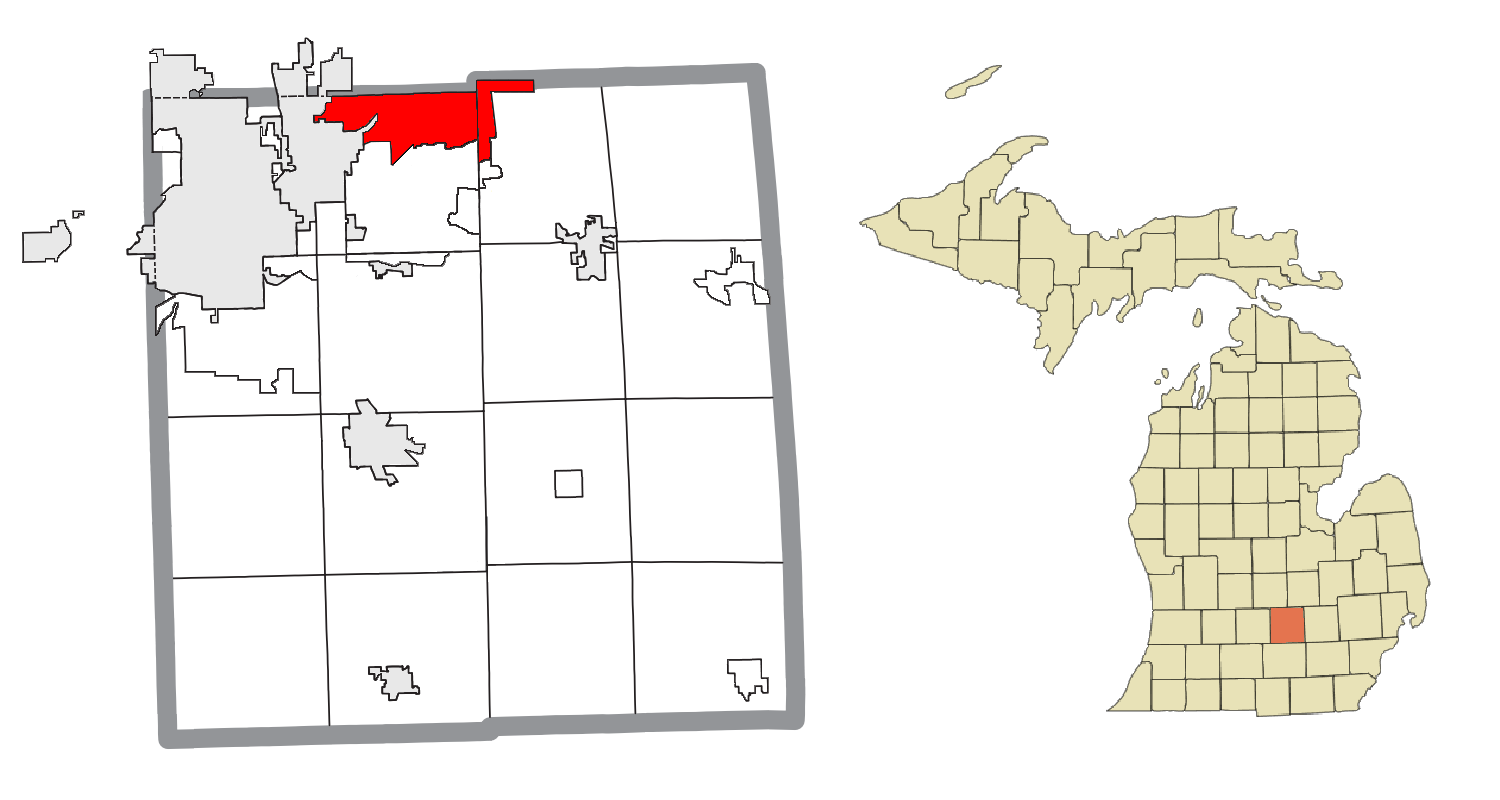
- Location within Ingham County

- Location within the state of Michigan Haslett (the United States)
- Coordinates: 42°45′09″N 84°24′07″W
- Country: United States
- State: Michigan
- County: Ingham
- Townships: Meridian and Williamstown

Area
  - Total: 16.29 sq mi (42.18 km^{2})
  - Land: 15.39 sq mi (39.87 km^{2})
  - Water: 0.90 sq mi (2.32 km^{2})
- Elevation: 850 ft (260 m)

Population (2020)
  - Total: 19,670
  - Density: 1,277.9/sq mi (493.41/km^{2})
- Time zone: UTC-5 (Eastern (EST))
  - Summer (DST): UTC-4 (EDT)
- ZIP code(s): 48823 (East Lansing); 48840; 48864 (Okemos); 48895 (Williamston)
- Area code: 517
- FIPS code: 26-37100
- GNIS feature ID: 2393043

Haslett is a census-designated place (CDP) in Ingham County in the U.S. state of Michigan. It is located mostly within Meridian Charter Township with a small portion extending east into Williamstown Township. The population was 19,670 at the 2020 census. Haslett contains its own school district, as well as its own post office with the 48840 ZIP Code.

== History ==
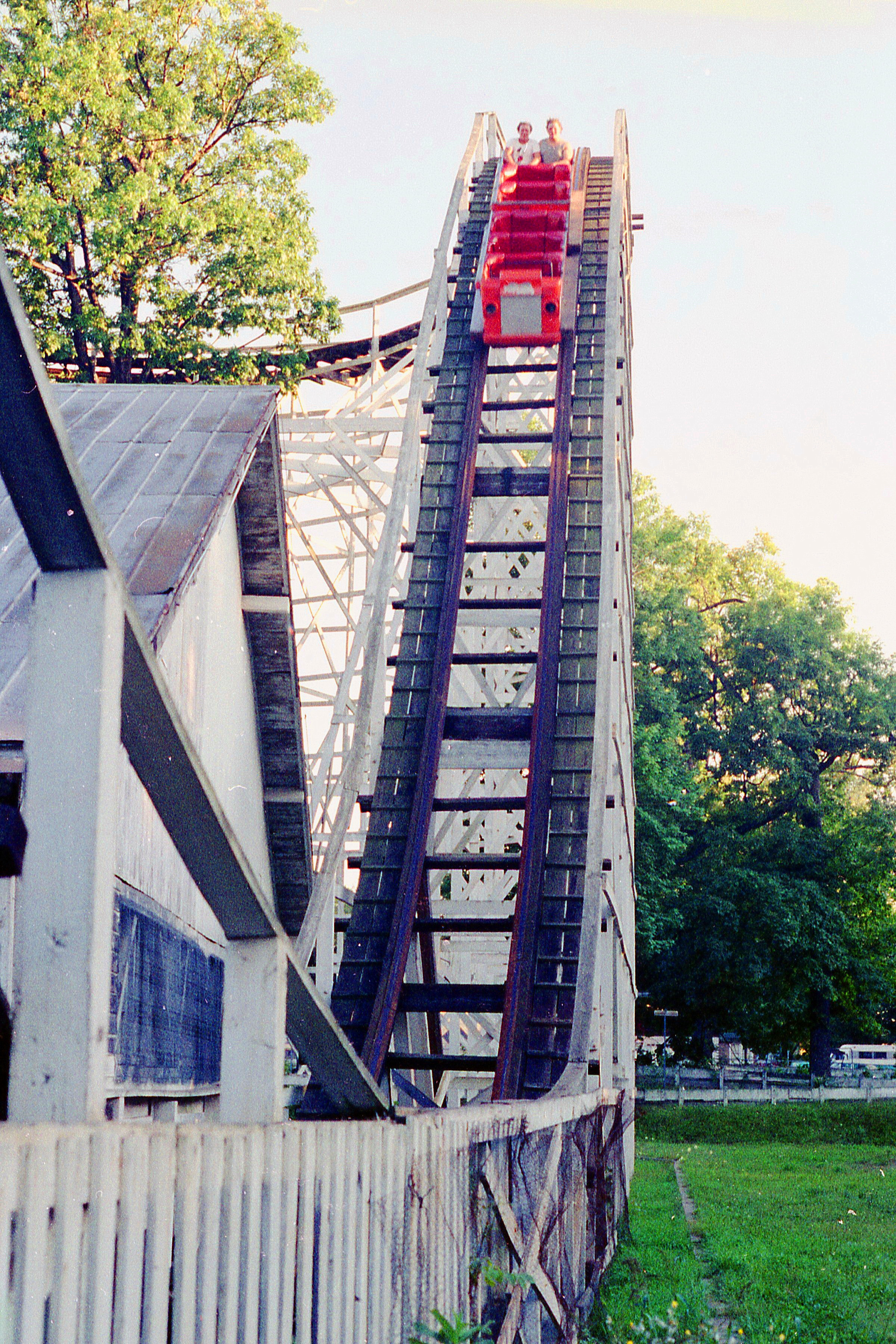
First Hill drop of the Roller Coaster at Lake Lansing Amusement Park (1972) shortly before demolition

Haslett is named after James and Sarah Haslett, a couple who founded the Nemoka Spiritualist Camp on the shore of Pine Lake (the original name for Lake Lansing). The spiritualist movement in the Lansing area traces its roots to 1882, when the first camp was established at Pine Lake. By the later 1800s, thousands of spiritualists descended on Haslett Park for summer meetings, readings, lectures, and séances. Mr. Haslett had hoped to establish his camp as the National Headquarters for the spiritualist movement. His untimely death in 1891 and the decline of the spiritualist movement caused his widow to sell the land to the Haslett Park Association in 1898. The new owners transformed the land into a summer recreational destination, and eventually a figure-8 wooden roller coaster and other carnival rides were added, establishing what became known as Lake Lansing Amusement Park. With the railroad already established, the Lansing Trolley line added rails so that people could travel from the state capital, Lansing, to the new recreation center. Holding to this tradition, Haslett is host to Lake Lansing Parks North and South as well as a portion of the Inter-Urban Pathway and numerous other small parks and recreation facilities.

The city of Haslet, Texas, is named after Haslett, Michigan (note that the Texas community is spelled with one 't'). The community was named for the Michigan hometown of the Gulf, Colorado and Santa Fe Railway's contractor, who brought the railroad through the area in 1883.

== Geography ==
According to the United States Census Bureau, the CDP has a total area of 16.27 square miles (42.14 km^{2}), of which 15.37 square miles (39.81 km^{2}) is land and 0.90 square miles (2.33 km^{2}) (5.53%) is water.

Haslett is in northern Ingham County and is bordered by the city of East Lansing to the west and the unincorporated community of Okemos to the south. Haslett is bordered to the north by Clinton County and Shiawassee County. Business Loop I-69 (East Saginaw Street) runs through the northwest part of Haslett, leading northeast to Interstate 69 in Clinton County and west into Lansing.

Haslett is most notable for being the home of Lake Lansing. The lake is 461 acres (1.87 km^{2}) in size and features two public parks, allowing access to beaches, fishing, and a boat launch. The Michigan State University Sailing Club and Lansing Sailing Club are located on Lake Lansing. From 1934 until 1974, an amusement park operated near the lake and featured a wooden roller coaster at the site that is now Lake Lansing Park South. In 2007, Business Week ranked Haslett 42nd on their list of "Best Places to Raise Your Kids".

=== Significant weather events ===
- On August 27–28, 2024, a line of severe thunderstorms swept across mid-Michigan, downing large trees and power lines throughout Haslett, including on Hillview Drive, Cypress Street, and Harvey Street, where a falling tree crushed a parked car; the storm left tens of thousands of Consumers Energy and Lansing Board of Water & Light customers in the Lansing area without power.
- On June 10–11, 2026, a severe thunderstorm system moved through mid-Michigan, and Haslett was among the communities hit hardest by outages as more than 120,000 Consumers Energy customers statewide lost power, with major outages reported in Haslett, DeWitt, Jackson, and Lansing.

== Demographics ==
Historical population
Census	Pop.	Note	%±
2020	19,670		—
U.S. Decennial Census

=== 2020 census ===
As of the 2020 census, Haslett had a population of 19,670. The median age was 41.1 years. 19.0% of residents were under the age of 18 and 21.6% of residents were 65 years of age or older. For every 100 females there were 91.3 males, and for every 100 females age 18 and over there were 88.0 males age 18 and over.

95.4% of residents lived in urban areas, while 4.6% lived in rural areas.

There were 9,020 households in Haslett, of which 23.0% had children under the age of 18 living in them. Of all households, 42.2% were married-couple households, 19.8% were households with a male householder and no spouse or partner present, and 31.8% were households with a female householder and no spouse or partner present. About 36.8% of all households were made up of individuals and 15.9% had someone living alone who was 65 years of age or older.

There were 9,560 housing units, of which 5.6% were vacant. The homeowner vacancy rate was 1.5% and the rental vacancy rate was 6.0%.

Racial composition as of the 2020 census
Race	Number	Percent
White	15,236	77.5%
Black or African American	967	4.9%
American Indian and Alaska Native	71	0.4%
Asian	1,519	7.7%
Native Hawaiian and Other Pacific Islander	1	0.0%
Some other race	416	2.1%
Two or more races	1,460	7.4%
Hispanic or Latino (of any race)	1,225	6.2%

=== 2000 census ===
As of the 2000 census, there were 11,283 people, 5,132 households, and 2,884 families residing in the CDP. The population density was 1,354.8 inhabitants per square mile (523.1/km^{2}). There were 5,355 housing units at an average density of 643.0 per square mile (248.3/km^{2}). The racial makeup of the CDP was 92.37% White, 2.39% Black or African American, 0.30% Native American, 2.71% Asian, 0.03% Pacific Islander, 0.73% from other races, and 1.47% from two or more races. Hispanic or Latino of any race were 2.48% of the population.

There were 5,132 households, out of which 28.4% had children under the age of 18 living with them, 43.5% were married couples living together, 9.9% had a female householder with no husband present, and 43.8% were non-families. 35.7% of all households were made up of individuals, and 11.4% had someone living alone who was 65 years of age or older. The average household size was 2.19 and the average family size was 2.90.

In the CDP, the population was spread out, with 23.3% under the age of 18, 9.5% from 18 to 24, 30.4% from 25 to 44, 25.2% from 45 to 64, and 11.6% who were 65 years of age or older. The median age was 38 years. For every 100 females, there were 85.9 males. For every 100 females age 18 and over, there were 82.3 males.

The median income for a household in the CDP was $50,679, and the median income for a family was $69,806. Males had a median income of $51,637 versus $35,786 for females. The per capita income for the CDP was $28,686. About 4.8% of families and 7.1% of the population were below the poverty line, including 7.6% of those under age 18 and 7.8% of those age 65 or over.

== Education ==
Most of Haslett is in Haslett Public Schools. Portions are in Okemos Public Schools, East Lansing Public Schools, and Williamston Community Schools. Respective senior high schools include Okemos High School, East Lansing High School, and Williamston High School.
