= Alaiedon Township, Michigan =

- Civil township
- Motto: The Hill Land for Excellent Living
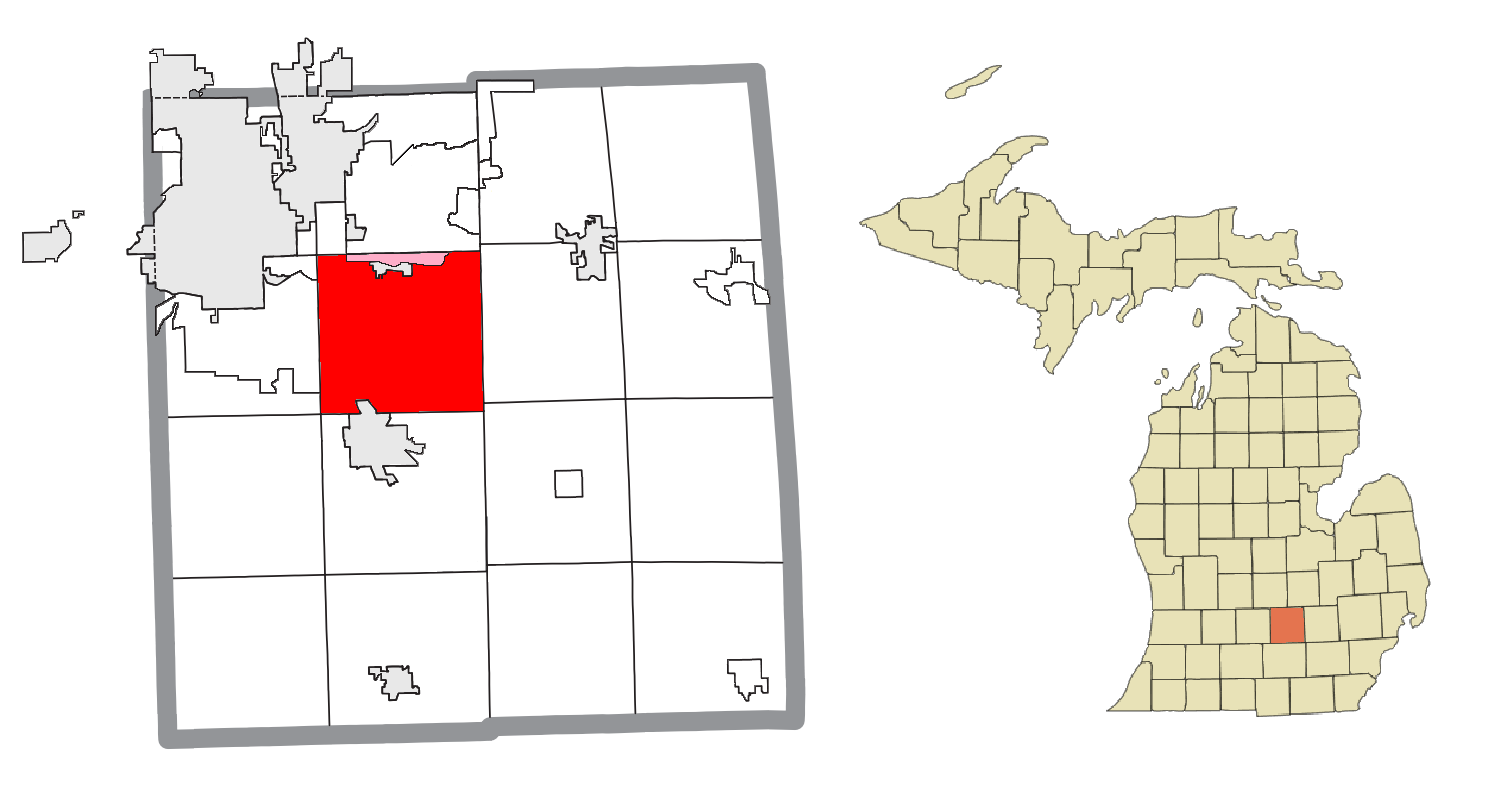
- Location within Ingham County (red) with an administered portion of the Okemos CDP (pink)

- Location within the state of Michigan Location within the United States
- Coordinates: 42°38′44″N 84°25′23″W
- Country: United States
- State: Michigan
- County: Ingham
- Established: 1838

Government
  - Supervisor: Steven Lott
  - Clerk: David Leonard

Area
  - Total: 35.77 sq mi (92.64 km^{2})
  - Land: 35.60 sq mi (92.20 km^{2})
  - Water: 0.17 sq mi (0.44 km^{2})
- Elevation: 909 ft (277 m)

Population (2020)
  - Total: 2,910
  - Density: 81.7/sq mi (31.6/km^{2})
- Time zone: UTC-5 (Eastern (EST))
  - Summer (DST): UTC-4 (EDT)
- ZIP code(s): 48842 (Holt); 48854 (Mason); 48864 (Okemos); 48895 (Williamston); 48910 (Lansing)
- Area code: 517
- FIPS code: 26-00800
- GNIS feature ID: 1625809
- Website: Official website

Alaiedon Township (/ˈælədən/ AL-ə-dən) is a civil township of Ingham County in the U.S. state of Michigan. As of the 2020 census, the township population was 2,910.

== Communities ==
- German was an area of the township originally settled by immigrants from Germany.
- The city of Lansing is to the northwest of the township and also controls a noncontiguous tract of land within the township along Interstate 96 under a conditional land transfer agreement.
- The unincorporated community of Okemos, which is largely in Meridian Charter Township, extends into the northern part of the township between Jolly Road and I-96.
- The city of Mason is to the south and has annexed land that was formerly within the township.
- The unincorporated community of Holt in Delhi Charter Township.
- Michigan State University owns land in the northwest corner of the township.

== History ==
The land that was to become the township was surveyed by a Musgrove Evans in 1827. James Phillips became the first person to settle in the township in December 1836 at a location known as Alaiedon Center. It was also known as German Settlement because most of its early residents were Germans. In 1837 the first settlement, Jefferson City, was platted and founded at what is today the Hagadorn and Lamb intersection along Mud Creek. The township was formally organized in 1842, and was named by Henry Schoolcraft, who came up with a pseudo-Native American name he claimed meant "hill land for excellent living." At the time of its organization, the township consisted of what is today Lansing, Meridian, Delhi and Alaiedon townships. The aforementioned townships would be spun off in 1842 to give the township the boundaries it has to this day.

The township's settlement pattern changed considerably in 1847, the same year the state capital was moved to Lansing Township. It was found that the town was never formally platted, and thus did not legally exist, preventing the settlement's residents from obtaining deeds to their properties. Subsequently, the town was abandoned and few traces remain of its existence today. In 1877, residents constructed a township hall on one-quarter of an acre of Ingham County's "poor farm" that served as the township hall until 1959 when a new one was constructed at 2021 West Holt Road.

In 1998, 2008, and 2013, the township entered into PA 425 Agreements, which conditionally transferred hundreds of acres of territory in the north-central part of the township to the city of Lansing to retain and expand the headquarters of Jackson National Life Insurance.

== Geography ==
According to the United States Census Bureau, the township has a total area of 35.77 square miles (92.64 km^{2}), of which 35.60 square miles (92.20 km^{2}) is land and 0.17 square miles (0.44 km^{2}) (0.48%) is water.

Sycamore Creek flows northward through the western part of the township. The eastern boundary of the township is the Michigan meridian used in the survey of Michigan.

== Demographics ==
As of the census of 2000, there were 3,498 people, 1,115 households, and 877 families residing in the township. The population density was 98.4 inhabitants per square mile (38.0/km^{2}). There were 1,154 housing units at an average density of 32.5 per square mile (12.5/km^{2}). The racial makeup of the township was 89.82% White, 6.15% African American, 0.63% Native American, 1.40% Asian, 0.06% Pacific Islander, 0.86% from other races, and 1.09% from two or more races. Hispanic or Latino of any race were 2.37% of the population.

There were 1,115 households, out of which 32.8% had children under the age of 18 living with them, 71.3% were married couples living together, 4.7% had a female householder with no husband present, and 21.3% were non-families. 17.2% of all households were made up of individuals, and 6.5% had someone living alone who was 65 years of age or older. The average household size was 2.71 and the average family size was 3.05.

In the township, the population was spread out, with 21.7% under the age of 18, 9.9% from 18 to 24, 28.9% from 25 to 44, 28.5% from 45 to 64, and 11.0% who were 65 years of age or older. The median age was 39 years. For every 100 females, there were 123.7 males. For every 100 females age 18 and over, there were 130.4 males.

The median income for a household in the township was $64,680, and the median income for a family was $69,261. Males had a median income of $52,500 versus $35,028 for females. The per capita income for the township was $24,048. About 1.9% of families and 5.2% of the population were below the poverty line, including 5.2% of those under age 18 and 7.4% of those aged 65 or over.

The 2000 Census was erroneously found to have included population in the nearby city of Mason within the boundaries of the township. Mason launched a successful census challenge putting the revised population of the township at 3,048 for the 2000 Census.

== Education ==
Most of the township is in Mason Public Schools. Parts of the township are in Okemos Public Schools and Williamston Community Schools.

Parts of Michigan State University extend into this township. The land includes the Poultry Teaching and Research Center as well as the Tree Research Center In 2024 the MSU board of trustees agreed to buy 92 acres (37 ha) of land in the township so the university's Dairy Cattle Teaching and Research Facility can use it.
