= Chippewa Middle School =

Chippewa Middle School may refer to:

- Chippewa Middle School, in the Okemos Public Schools school district, Michigan
- Chippewa Middle School, in the Mounds View Public Schools school district, Minnesota
