= Okemos, Michigan =

Census-designated place in Michigan, US

- Census-designated place (CDP) & unincorporated community
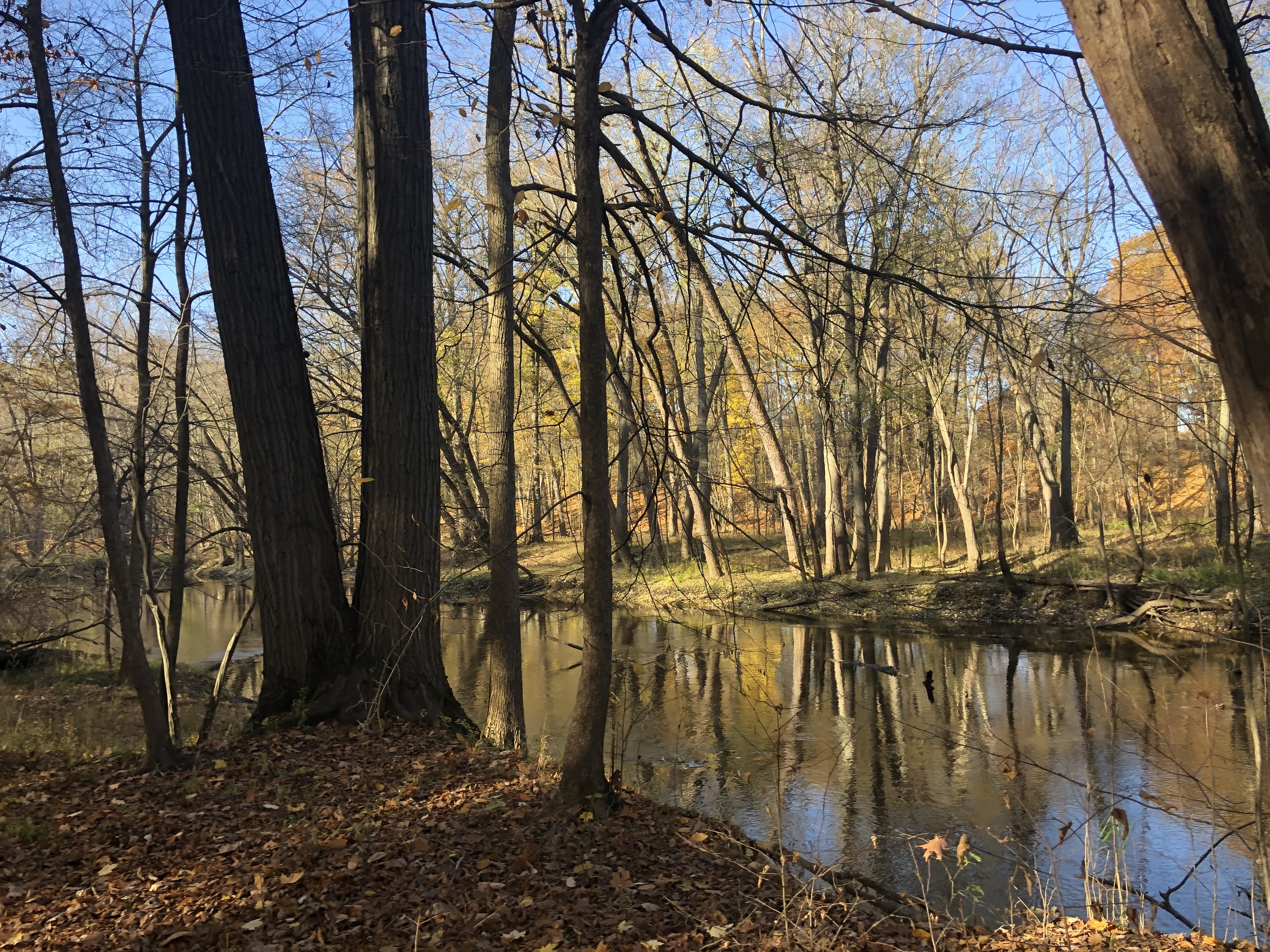
- The Red Cedar River flowing through Okemos.

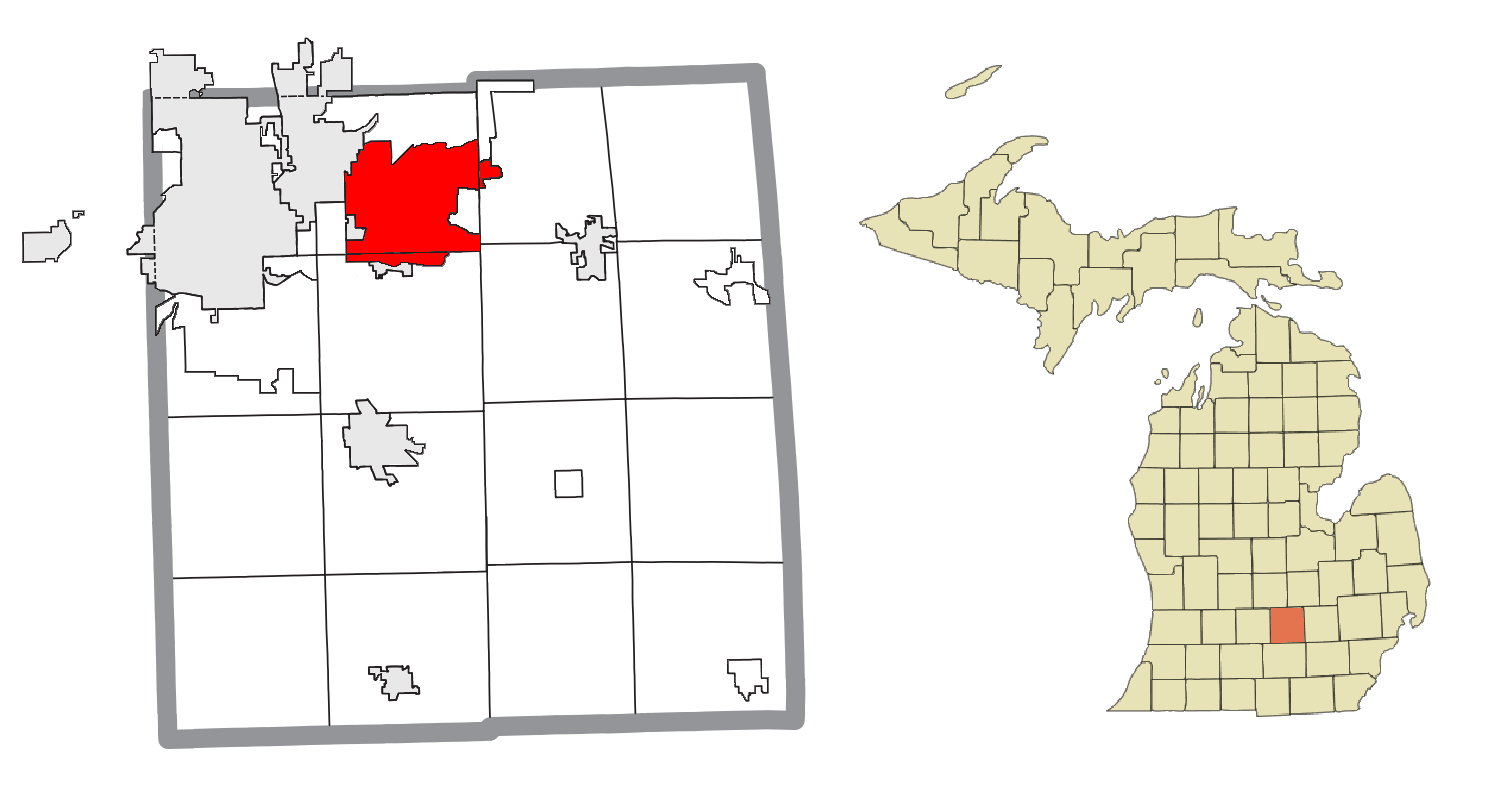
- Location within Ingham County

- Location within the state of Michigan Location within the United States
- Coordinates: 42°42′21″N 84°24′49″W
- Country: United States
- State: Michigan
- County: Ingham
- Townships: Alaiedon, Meridian, and Williamstown
- Settled: 1839
- Named for: Chief Okemos

Area
  - Total: 17.01 sq mi (44.06 km^{2})
  - Land: 16.86 sq mi (43.66 km^{2})
  - Water: 0.15 sq mi (0.40 km^{2})
- Elevation: 866 ft (264 m)

Population (2020)
  - Total: 25,121
  - Density: 1,490.2/sq mi (575.37/km^{2})
- Time zone: UTC-5 (Eastern (EST))
  - Summer (DST): UTC-4 (EDT)
- ZIP codes: 48805, 48864; 48895 (Williamston)
- Area code: 517
- FIPS code: 26-60340
- GNIS feature ID: 2393172

Okemos (/ˈoʊkəməs/ OH-kə-məss) is a census-designated place (CDP) in Ingham County in the U.S. state of Michigan. A suburb of Lansing, Okemos is located immediately southeast of East Lansing. Okemos is located mostly within Meridian Charter Township, with small portions extending south into Alaiedon Township and east into Williamstown Township. As of the 2020 census, the CDP had a population of 25,121.

Okemos has post offices with 48805 and 48864 ZIP Codes, and the school district Okemos Public Schools, that also serves portions of the surrounding area.

== History ==
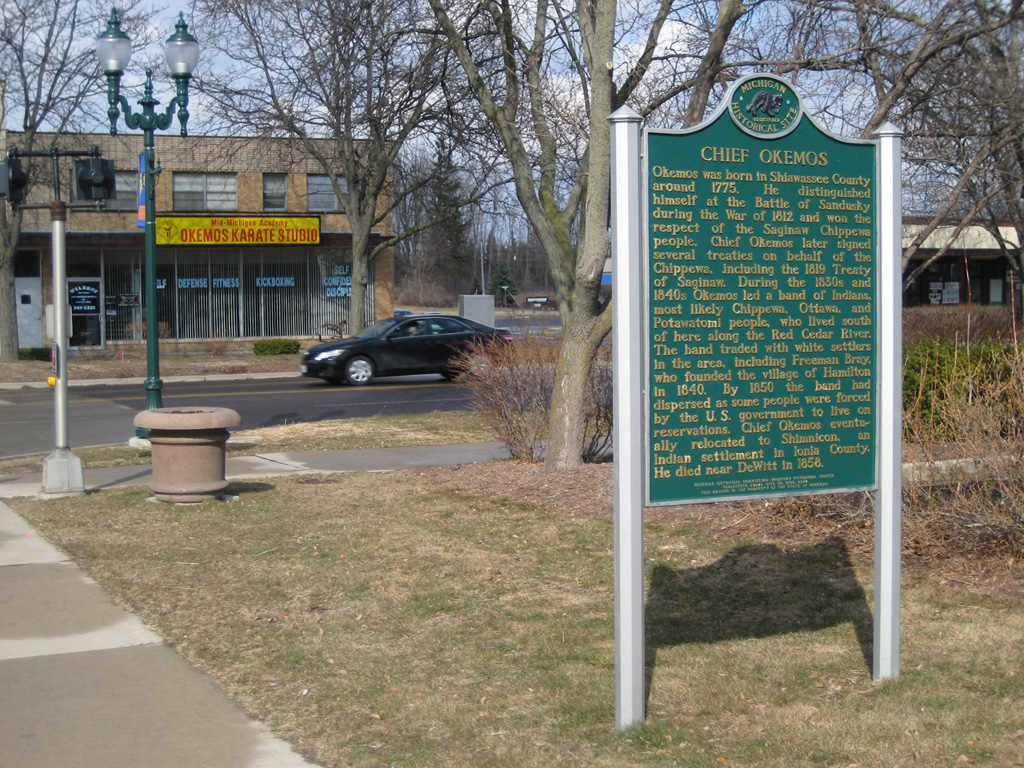
Chief Okemos historic marker at the Four Corners of Okemos

Pioneer Freeman Bray platted the village in 1841, giving it the name of Hamilton. Residents called it Okemos, after chief John Okemos ("Little Chief"), of the Ojibway (Chippewa) people. In 1859, the State legislature officially named the village "Okemos" in honor of the chief.

The Red Cedar River, a tributary of the Grand River, flows from east to west through Okemos.

== Climate ==
This climatic region is typified by large seasonal temperature differences, with warm to hot (and often humid) summers and cold (sometimes severely cold) winters. According to the Köppen Climate Classification system, Okemos has a humid continental climate, abbreviated "Dfb" on climate maps.

== Demographics ==
Historical population
Census	Pop.	Note	%±
2010	21,369		—
2020	25,121		17.6%
U.S. Decennial Census

=== 2020 census ===
As of the 2020 census, Okemos had a population of 25,121. The median age was 35.6 years. 21.2% of residents were under the age of 18 and 16.6% of residents were 65 years of age or older. For every 100 females there were 94.4 males, and for every 100 females age 18 and over there were 92.2 males age 18 and over.

97.6% of residents lived in urban areas, while 2.4% lived in rural areas.

There were 10,228 households in Okemos, of which 29.8% had children under the age of 18 living in them. Of all households, 49.5% were married-couple households, 20.7% were households with a male householder and no spouse or partner present, and 25.4% were households with a female householder and no spouse or partner present. About 28.9% of all households were made up of individuals and 8.6% had someone living alone who was 65 years of age or older.

There were 10,917 housing units, of which 6.3% were vacant. The homeowner vacancy rate was 1.0% and the rental vacancy rate was 8.2%.

Racial composition as of the 2020 census
Race	Number	Percent
White	16,626	66.2%
Black or African American	1,302	5.2%
American Indian and Alaska Native	68	0.3%
Asian	5,058	20.1%
Native Hawaiian and Other Pacific Islander	2	0.0%
Some other race	367	1.5%
Two or more races	1,698	6.8%
Hispanic or Latino (of any race)	1,146	4.6%

=== 2010 census ===
As of the census of 2010, there were 21,369 people, 8,824 households, and 5,416 families residing in the CDP. The population density was 1,274.7 inhabitants per square mile (492.2/km^{2}). There were 9,384 housing units at an average density of 554.9 per square mile (214.2/km^{2}). The racial makeup of the CDP was 76.5% White, 14.4% Asian, 5.1% Black or African American, 0.3% Native American, 0.1% Pacific Islander, 1.1% from other races, and 2.6% from two or more races. Hispanic or Latino residents of any race were 3.3% of the population.

=== 2000 census ===
There were 9,194 households, out of which 31.7% had children under the age of 18 living with them, 52.3% were married couples living together, 6.7% had a female householder with no husband present, and 38.6% were non-families. 25.9% of all households were made up of individuals, and 4.7% had someone living alone who was 65 years of age or older. The average household size was 2.44 and the average family size was 3.04.

In the CDP, 23.9% of the population was under the age of 18, 14.5% was from 18 to 24, 26.0% from 25 to 44, 25.9% from 45 to 64, and 9.7% who were 65 years of age or older. The median age was 35 years. For every 100 females, there were 93.5 males. For every 100 females age 18 and over, there were 90.1 males.

The median income for an average household in the CDP was $62,810, and the median income for a family was $88,459 (These figures had risen to $75,736 and $101,903 respectively as of a 2007 estimate). Males had a median income of $60,601 versus $41,393 for females. The per capita income for the CDP was $33,401. About 3.3% of families and 9.6% of the population were below the poverty line, including 5.0% of those under age 18 and 0.5% of those age 65 or over.

=== Accolades ===
In 2011, CNN Money Magazine rated Okemos as the 12th-best city to live in for "the rich and single".

== Education ==
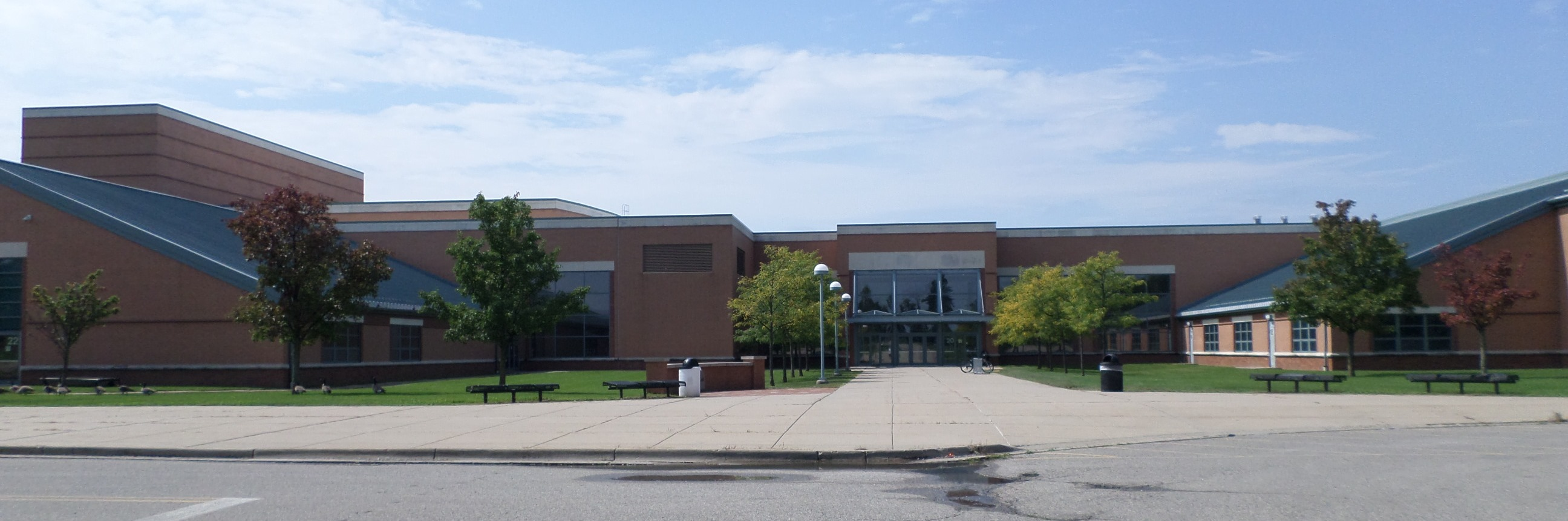
Okemos High School

Most of Okemos CDP is served by Okemos Public Schools, the district which operates Okemos High School.

Portions of the district for Okemos Public Schools extends into Alaiedon Township to the south, Williamstown Township to the east, and Haslett to the north.

Williamston Community Schools covers portions of Okemos CDP while another part is in Mason Public Schools.

== People ==
- Travis Bader, professional basketball player
- Bill Boyle, soccer player and coach
- Kim Chi, stage name of Sang-Young Shin, a Korean-American drag queen, artist
- Alma Cooper, Miss USA 2024
- Doc Corbin Dart, punk rock musician
- Curtis Cregan, singer and theater actor
- Monica Drake, author
- Cynthia Frelund, sports analyst and writer working for NFL Network
- Lawrence Joseph Giacoletto, electrical engineer and inventor
- Madison Hubbell, 2018 US Olympic ice dancer
- James Hynes, novelist, born in Okemos in 1955
- Susan Jacoby, author, born and raised in Okemos
- Josh Meyers, comedian, Mad TV cast member
- Seth Meyers, comedian, Saturday Night Live attended Edgewood Elementary
- Taylor Moton, NFL player, attended Okemos Public Schools
- Tyler Oakley, YouTuber, blogger, and LGBT activist
- Larry Page, co-founder of Google, went to Montessori School in Okemos
- Heather Raffo, playwright, author of Nine Parts of Desire
- John Bennett Ramsey, father of JonBenét Ramsey, attended Okemos High School
- Andrew Robl, professional poker player
- Ben Schneider, founding member of the indie rock band Lord Huron
- Tom Welling, actor, played Clark Kent in television series Smallville

== Points of interest ==
- Goetsch–Winckler House. Designed by Frank Lloyd Wright, and of the earlier examples of his "Usonian" houses.
- The Meridian Historical Village
- Meridian Farmers' Market
- Ferguson Park, along the Red Cedar River on Okemos Road, is thought to be the meeting place where Chief Okemos and the war chiefs held their powwows. The park is part of the oldest settlement in the area along the plank road between Detroit and the Capitol in Lansing.
- The Hamilton Building at 2160 Hamilton Road (near the Four Corners of Okemos), is the oldest commercial building in Okemos, and replaced the old Walker General Store, which was built in 1853. The Hamilton Building held its first ice cream social on June 11, 1904, and was built to house the Independent Order of Odd Fellows, a charity organization. The planks in the building are from the walnut grove on which it sits. Along with Ferguson Park, it is also part of the oldest settlement in the area along the old plank road between Detroit and the Capitol in Lansing.
- Meridian Mall
- The Hope Borbas Okemos branch of the Capital Area District Library
