= John Okemos =

Ojibwa-Odawa Chief "John" Okemos

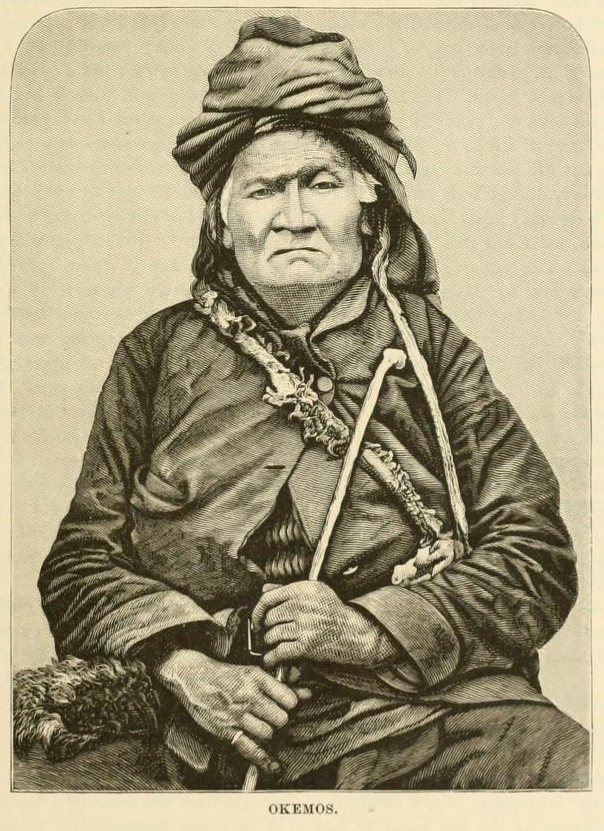
Ojibwa-Odawa Chief John Okemos

Ojibwa-Odawa Chief "John" Okemos(Ojibwe: Ogimaans; c. 1775 – 1858) was a Ohioan Ojibwa (Ojibwa) chief. He participated in Tecumseh's War and was a signatory of the Treaty of Saginaw. "Okemos" was the anglicised form of his Ojibwa language name ogimaans meaning "Little Chief". "John" was an adopted name.

== Early years ==
The exact date and location of Okemos' birth is unknown, although it's widely attributed to have been in what is now Shiawassee County, Michigan. Two registered historical markers attribute his birth here, possibly around the Knaggs Bridge area. He was probably born in the mid-1770s (although at least one of his white contemporaries - Freeman Bray - put his birth year as far back as the 1750s). When deposed in 1856, Chief Okemos made the following statement: "I was born in Michigan, near Pontiac, on an island in a lake… I was 30 years old when I left the place I was born." One possible location that Okemos was referring to could be Apple Island in Orchard Lake, located in present-day Orchard Lake, Michigan.

== Family ==
Okemos indicated that his mother's father was the Ojibwe chief Min-e-to-gob-o-way and his uncle was the Odawa chief Kob-e-ko-no-ka.

In his old age, Okemos, being in poverty, went to Sarnia, Canada to request a military pension from the British government. On that trip, his wife died and was "buried among strangers."

He is believed to be the father of A-da-wah-qua Ogimas, who was one of the wives of Chief Cobmoosa of the Flat River Band of Ojibwe-Odawa. It is unclear how many other children he had, but three have been ascertained: Jim, John, and Mary (whose native name was Mekchis Quahwis Okemos).

== Years with the British Army ==
The first formal reference to Okemos appears in 1796 when Okemos and 16 other men enlisted in the British armed forces as scouts.

Okemos fought at the Battle of Lower Sandusky (also called the Battle of Fort Stephenson) in what is now northern Ohio. The battle took place on August 2, 1813 during the War of 1812. Although the British lost the battle and the United States repulsed the attack, Okemos accrued considerable respect in the fighting, which raised his standing among the Ojibwa. During the battle, Okemos was slashed with a saber; this left a five-inch (127 mm) scar on his forehead that remained for the rest of his life as a distinguishing feature.

== Later years ==
At the Treaty of Saginaw in 1819, Okemos represented the Ojibwa people. While several other tribes were represented by their leaders, the Ojibwa lost the most territory in this treaty. Other tribes with people displaced in this treaty were the Ottawa and Potawatomi. Okemos and the other Native American chiefs signed the treaty with General Lewis Cass, giving up six million acres (24,000 km^{2}) of land in what is now southern Michigan to the United States government.

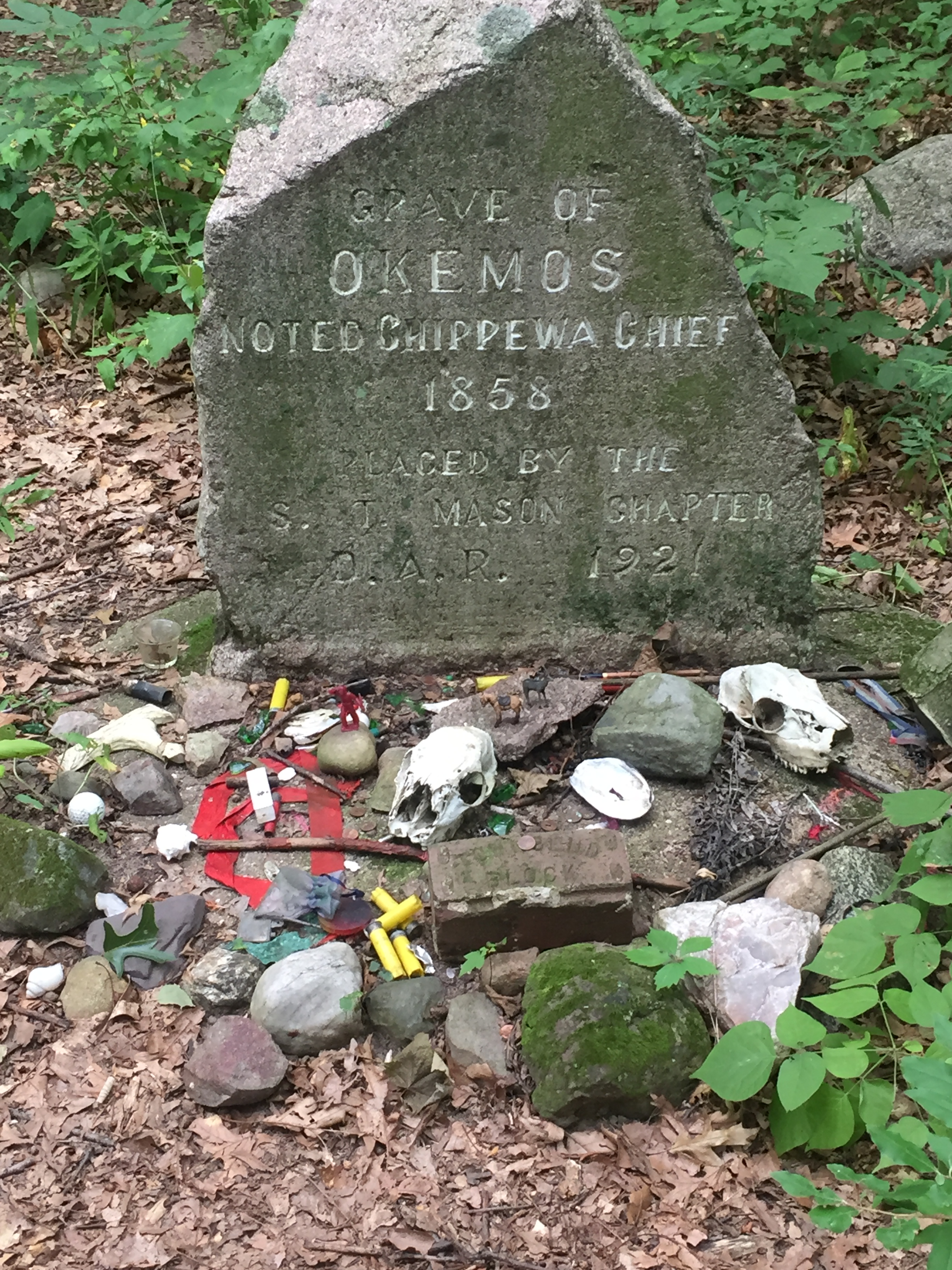
Gravesite of Chief John Okemos

By the 1830s, Okemos was recognized as a leader not only of the Saginaw Chippewa, but of many other Ojibwa bands. He also acted as a leader of some Ottawa and Potawatomi groups who lived south of the Red Cedar River. A Michigan state historical marker in Meridian Township indicates the area where Okemos and his people lived during this time.

Following the white settlement of the area beginning in 1839, Okemos and his people conducted an active trading business through the 1840s. By 1850, disregarding the Treaty of Saginaw, the United States government began moving Native Americans to reservations from the lands where Okemos led his people. In the early 1850s, Okemos moved to Ionia County, Michigan. Okemos died near DeWitt, Michigan in 1858. He is buried in the Native American mission village of Shim-ni-con in Ionia County.

== Legacy ==
- Okemos, Michigan is named in honor of Chief Okemos.
- There is a plaque erected in his honor at Central Elementary School in Okemos, MI. His tribe once occupied the land on which the school now stands.
