= John Van Dam =

American football player and coach (born 1984)

Jacksonville Jaguars
- Title: Pass game specialist

Personal information
- Born: August 18, 1984 (age 42)
- Listed height: 6 ft 3 in (1.91 m)
- Listed weight: 225 lb (102 kg)

Career information
- Position: Quarterback
- High school: Okemos (MI)
- College: Michigan State (2003–2007)

Career history
- Augustana (South Dakota) (2008–2009) Graduate assistant & tight ends coach; Augustana (South Dakota) (2010–2011) Wide receivers coach; Alabama (2012–2013) Offensive graduate assistant; Michigan (2014) Offensive quality control assistant; Florida (2015) Offensive quality control assistant & assistant quarterbacks coach; Southern Illinois (2016–2017) Offensive coordinator & quarterbacks coach; Lafayette (2018) Offensive coordinator & quarterbacks coach; Tampa Bay Buccaneers (2019–2024); Offensive quality control coach (2019-2020); Assistant tight ends coach (2021); Tight ends coach (2022-2023); Pass game assistant (2024); Jacksonville Jaguars (2025–present) Pass game specialist

Awards and highlights
- BCS national champion (2012); Super Bowl champion (LV)

John Van Dam (born August 18, 1984) is an American football coach and former player who currently serves as the pass game specialist for the Jacksonville Jaguars of the National Football League (NFL). He played college football for the Michigan State Spartans and has previously coached the Augustana (South Dakota) Vikings, Alabama Crimson Tide, Michigan Wolverines, Florida Gators, Southern Illinois Salukis and Lafayette Leopards.

== Early life ==
Van Dam was born on August 18, 1984, and grew up in East Lansing, Michigan. He attended Okemos High School where he was a member of the football, lacrosse and track and field teams. He played quarterback and outside linebacker in football and had 179 passing yards and 11 tackles as a senior.

Van Dam was a walk-on quarterback with the Michigan State Spartans, where his father had been an assistant coach. He played five seasons for Michigan State and backed-up several future National Football League (NFL) players, including Nick Foles, Drew Stanton, Brian Hoyer and Kirk Cousins. He appeared in one game each in his freshman, sophomore and junior years for the Spartans.

== Coaching career ==
Van Dam began his coaching career with the Augustana Vikings (South Dakota) in 2008, serving for two seasons as a graduate assistant and tight ends coach before moving to wide receivers coach in 2010, a position he remained in through 2011. He helped Augustana reach consecutive Mineral Water Bowls in 2008 and 2009 and they made their first playoff appearance in over 20 years in 2010.

After his stint at Augustana, Van Dam served two years as a graduate assistant for the Alabama Crimson Tide and helped them win a national championship. He followed Doug Nussmeier to the Michigan Wolverines in 2014, being named an offensive quality control assistant. The following year, Van Dam served as assistant quarterbacks coach and offensive quality control assistant for the Florida Gators. He became offensive coordinator and quarterbacks coach for the Southern Illinois Salukis in 2016, helping them have a top offense in the conference in his two years there. He was the offensive coordinator and quarterbacks coach for the Lafayette Leopards for one season in 2018.

In 2019, Van Dam moved to the professional ranks and was hired by the Tampa Bay Buccaneers as an offensive quality control coach. He helped them win Super Bowl LV in 2020 and received a promotion to assistant tight ends coach in 2021. He was promoted to head tight ends coach in 2022. He was among the candidates the team interviewed for their offensive coordinator position in 2024.

On February 6, 2025, the Jacksonville Jaguars hired Van Dam to serve as their pass game specialist.
