= Lawrence J. Giacoletto =

American electrical engineer and inventor

Lawrence Joseph Giacoletto (November 14, 1916, in Clinton, Indiana – October 4, 2004, in Okemos, Michigan) was an American electrical engineer and inventor. He was known among others for his work in the field of semiconductor circuit technology, in particular by the eponymous Giacoletto equivalent circuit for transistors (also known as Hybrid-pi model).

== Life ==
Giacoletto studied first at the Rose-Hulman Institute of Technology in Terre Haute. In 1952 he received his doctorate in electrical engineering from the University of Michigan. After his discharge from military service in 1946 Giacoletto began as a development engineer at the RCA Laboratories in Princeton, New Jersey. In 1956 he joined the Ford Motor Company in Dearborn, Michigan, where he served as manager of the Electronics Department of Scientific Labs. Coinciding with this change, he founded the Cooperative Research Institute (CORES). Here he continued his research in the field of vehicle electronics and developed ideas for improving a variety of products. In the late '50s he also worked in the field of home-production of solar energy.

Later during the late '60s, '70s and '80s, Giacoletto taught thousands of Electrical Engineering Graduate and Undergraduate students at Michigan State University in East Lansing, MI. Electrical Engineering students had an interesting moniker for him. He was known as "1-point Giacoletto" due to his high academic standards and low tolerance for incompetence. Giacoletto's exams were notoriously difficult and students felt "lucky" to escape his classes with a 1-point (D average).

Giacoletto died at his home in Okemos, Michigan on October 4, 2004.

== Works ==
He worked in the development of the RCA color television system, developed the equivalent circuit for transistors and invented the homopolar alternator, a device able to convert mechanical energy into electrical energy. He also contributed significantly to early work in electronic ignition circuits at Ford Sci. Labs, found in all modern-day vehicles.

He authored or co-authored the following books:

- RCA Laboratories Transistor I Book. RCA Laboratories, 1956.
- Differential Amplifiers. New York, Wiley-Interscience, 1970, ISBN 0-471-29724-0.
- The Electronics Designers Handbook. McGraw-Hill, 1977, ISBN 0-07-023149-4.

== Awards ==
Giacoletto contributed by the awards Fellow of the IEEE and a Fellow of the American Association for the Advancement of Science. He was a member of the American Physical Society and Sigma Xi and a number of boards. In 2011 it was honored by the Rose-Hulman Institute of Technology with the establishment of an endowed faculty chair in electrical engineering.

== See also ==
- Hybrid-pi model
- Small-signal model
