= Williamston, Michigan =

- City
- City of Williamston
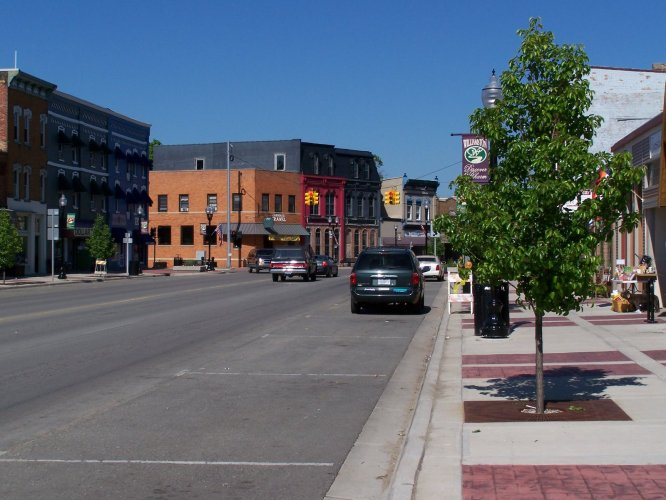
- Downtown looking east along Grand River Avenue

- Seal
- Motto: Discover the Charm
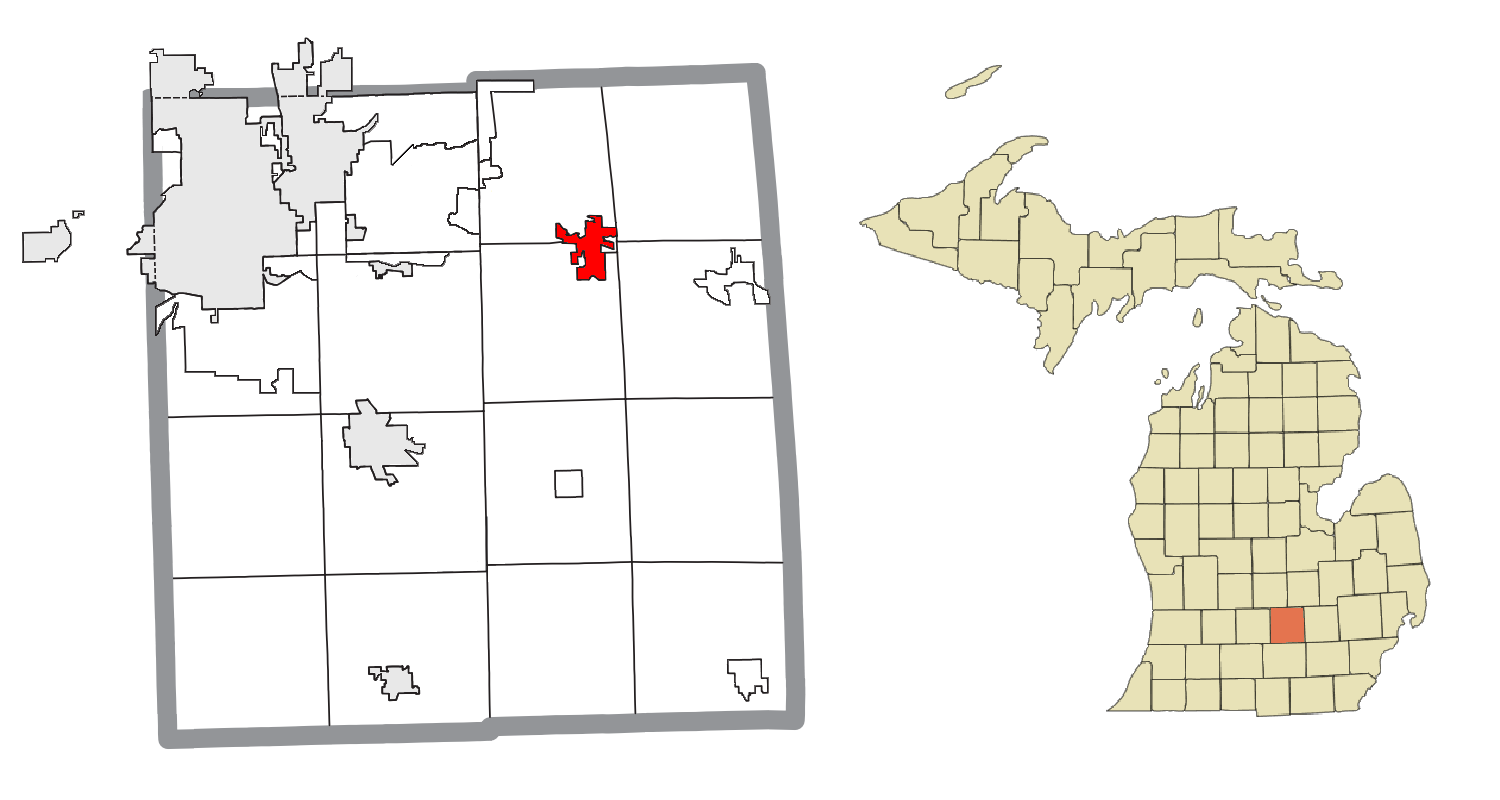
- Location within Ingham County

- Location within the state of Michigan Location within the United States
- Coordinates: 42°41′00″N 84°17′01″W
- Country: United States
- State: Michigan
- County: Ingham
- Settled: 1834
- Incorporated: 1871 (village); 1945 (city)

Government
  - Type: Mayor–council
  - Mayor: Tammy Gilroy
  - Manager: John Hanifan

Area
  - Total: 2.53 sq mi (6.54 km^{2})
  - Land: 2.45 sq mi (6.35 km^{2})
  - Water: 0.069 sq mi (0.18 km^{2})
- Elevation: 892 ft (272 m)

Population (2020)
  - Total: 3,819
  - Density: 1,556.6/sq mi (600.99/km^{2})
- Time zone: UTC-5 (EST)
  - Summer (DST): UTC-4 (EDT)
- ZIP code(s): 48895
- Area code: 517
- FIPS code: 26-87420
- GNIS feature ID: 1627274
- Website: Official website

Williamston is a city in Ingham County in the U.S. state of Michigan. The population was 3,819 at the 2020 census. Williamston is located east of the city of Lansing and borders Williamstown Township to the north and Wheatfield Township to the south. The Red Cedar River and M-43 run through the center of the city.

== History ==
The location that was later to become Williamston started as the crossroad of the Grand River and Saginaw Indian Trails. It was first occupied by a small band of the Saginaw tribe of the Chippewa People which by the mid-19th century used the area as a 'summer village' (it was not used by them year-round, but they 'wintered' in the area that is now Meridian Township). They used Williamston for planting crops, burying their dead, and holding an annual spring gathering, primarily using the land just north of the Red Cedar River.

The area was settled by Europeans in 1834 when Hiram and Joseph Putnam moved briefly to the area from Jackson. They spent less than one full year in the area, planting and then harvesting one crop of oats. Today, inside the city limits, Williamston Road becomes Putnam Street, having been named in their honor. (For many years, several street signs inside the city were misspelled as "Putman Street", leading to confusion about the correct spelling.)

In 1839, the Putnams sold their land to Oswald B., James M., and Horace B. Williams, three brothers from Batavia, New York. James M. "Miles" Williams, who built a dam, sawmill and later a grist mill in town, eventually platted the land in 1845 and named the town "Williamstown" after himself. It is unknown how it lost the "w" in its name.

The town was a popular stop on the Grand River trail (that later became a plank road) from Detroit to Lansing in the 19th century. That trail is now Grand River Avenue (M-43) which runs through downtown Williamston. Because the primary means of transportation at that time was the horse and buggy and because the trip from Detroit to Lansing took more than one day, Williamston became a convenient overnight stop.

The town was incorporated as a village in 1871, and later as a city on April 1, 1945. A later revised City Charter was adopted by the people effective in April 1963. This charter has been amended several times but remains in effect today.

A history of the area was published for the City's centennial celebration in 1971. It included many photographs and stories of the early city and its inhabitants. There were earlier histories, as well, published in 1880, the 1930s, and in 1963.

== Geography ==
Williamston is located 15 miles east of Lansing, the state capital city of Michigan, and 11 miles east of East Lansing, the home of Michigan State University. The city is located two miles north of I-96, which provides access to Lansing and Detroit.

According to the United States Census Bureau, the city has a total area of 2.52 square miles (6.53 km^{2}), of which 2.45 square miles (6.35 km^{2}) is land and 0.07 square miles (0.18 km^{2}) (0.02%) is water.

The Red Cedar River, a tributary of the Grand River, passes just north of the center of town. Lake Lansing is also located in nearby Haslett and is approximately 500 acres (2.0 km^{2}) in size.

=== Climate ===
This climatic region is typified by large seasonal temperature differences, with warm to hot (and often humid) summers and cold (sometimes severely cold) winters. According to the Köppen Climate Classification system, Williamston has a humid continental climate, abbreviated "Dfb" on climate maps.

== Demographics ==
Historical population
Census	Pop.	Note	%±
1880	982		—
1890	1,139		16.0%
1900	1,113		−2.3%
1910	1,042		−6.4%
1920	1,060		1.7%
1930	1,458		37.5%
1940	1,704		16.9%
1950	2,051		20.4%
1960	2,214		7.9%
1970	2,600		17.4%
1980	2,981		14.7%
1990	2,922		−2.0%
2000	3,441		17.8%
2010	3,854		12.0%
2020	3,819		−0.9%
U.S. Decennial Census

=== 2020 census ===
As of the 2020 census, Williamston had a population of 3,819. The median age was 40.2 years. 22.5% of residents were under the age of 18 and 18.2% of residents were 65 years of age or older. For every 100 females there were 93.5 males, and for every 100 females age 18 and over there were 90.4 males age 18 and over.

100.0% of residents lived in urban areas, while 0.0% lived in rural areas.

There were 1,685 households in Williamston, of which 27.1% had children under the age of 18 living in them. Of all households, 44.3% were married-couple households, 18.7% were households with a male householder and no spouse or partner present, and 30.6% were households with a female householder and no spouse or partner present. About 35.4% of all households were made up of individuals and 13.9% had someone living alone who was 65 years of age or older.

There were 1,821 housing units, of which 7.5% were vacant. The homeowner vacancy rate was 2.3% and the rental vacancy rate was 6.6%.

Racial composition as of the 2020 census
Race	Number	Percent
White	3,448	90.3%
Black or African American	35	0.9%
American Indian and Alaska Native	11	0.3%
Asian	41	1.1%
Native Hawaiian and Other Pacific Islander	0	0.0%
Some other race	52	1.4%
Two or more races	232	6.1%
Hispanic or Latino (of any race)	152	4.0%

=== 2010 census ===
As of the census of 2010, there were 3,854 people, 1,605 households, and 1,002 families residing in the city. The population density was 1,579.5 inhabitants per square mile (609.8/km^{2}). There were 1,789 housing units at an average density of 733.2 per square mile (283.1/km^{2}). The racial makeup of the city was 94.4% White, 0.9% African American, 0.5% Native American, 1.1% Asian, 0.1% Pacific Islander, 0.7% from other races, and 2.3% from two or more races. Hispanic or Latino of any race were 3.1% of the population.

There were 1,605 households, of which 35.8% had children under the age of 18 living with them, 46.2% were married couples living together, 12.2% had a female householder with no husband present, 4.0% had a male householder with no wife present, and 37.6% were non-families. 31.9% of all households were made up of individuals, and 11.2% had someone living alone who was 65 years of age or older. The average household size was 2.40 and the average family size was 3.05.

The median age in the city was 35.9 years. 28% of residents were under the age of 18; 7.7% were between the ages of 18 and 24; 28.5% were from 25 to 44; 24% were from 45 to 64; and 11.7% were 65 years of age or older. The gender makeup of the city was 47.7% male and 52.3% female.

=== 2000 census ===
As of the U.S. Census of 2000, there were 3,441 people, 1,470 households, and 905 families residing in the city. The population density was 1,351.2 inhabitants per square mile (521.7/km^{2}). There were 1,528 housing units at an average density of 600.0 per square mile (231.7/km^{2}). The racial makeup of the city was 96.95% White, 0.17% African American, 0.32% Native American, 0.70% Asian, 0.70% from other races, and 1.16% from two or more races. Hispanic or Latino of any race were 2.94% of the population.

There were 1,470 households, out of which 33.3% had children under the age of 18 living with them, 46.4% were married couples living together, 11.6% had a female householder with no husband present, and 38.4% were non-families. 31.9% of all households were made up of individuals, and 9.8% had someone living alone who was 65 years of age or older. The average household size was 2.33 and the average family size was 2.99.

In the city, the population was spread out, with 27.0% under the age of 18, 8.9% from 18 to 24, 32.1% from 25 to 44, 19.6% from 45 to 64, and 12.4% who were 65 years of age or older. The median age was 34 years. For every 100 females, there were 88.4 males. For every 100 females age 18 and over, there were 85.8 males.

The median income for a household in the city was $39,727, and the median income for a family was $51,014. Males had a median income of $38,375 versus $30,174 for females. The per capita income for the city was $22,798. About 6.4% of families and 8.2% of the population were below the poverty line, including 9.2% of those under age 18 and 5.2% of those age 65 or over.

== Economy ==
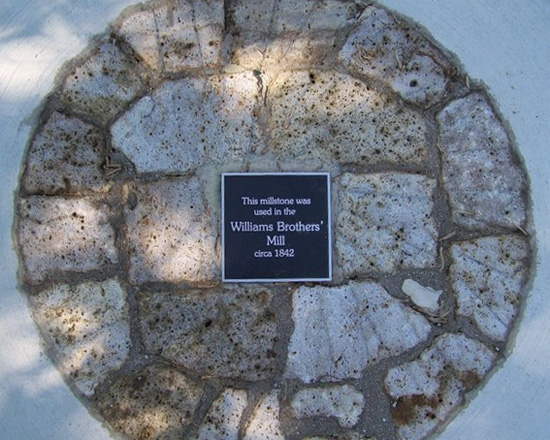
Grindstone from the Williams' Mill of the mid-1800s

The modern economy is primarily that of a bedroom community. Many residents commute to local, larger towns such as Okemos, East Lansing, or Lansing, where most of the employment is located. The Williamston community was once very reliant on farming as an occupation, however, its prominence in the community has since declined. Although there is no longer much farmland within the city limits, the surrounding area is still devoted to farming.

Today, Williamston is well known to the mid-Michigan area for its antiques stores and specialty shops in the downtown area. Williamston is home to two golf courses, The Brookshire Restaurant and Golf Course and Wheatfield Valley Golf Course, as well as a live theatre called Williamston Theatre, and an old-style single screen movie theatre called The Sun Theatre. There is a Williamston branch of the Capital Area District Library, restaurants, a market, grocery store, the Sun Theatre, and numerous smaller clothing stores, boutiques, special interest shops and antique dealers. The Meridian Mall is located in nearby Okemos. The largest employer in the City is the Williamston Community Schools with 170 employees.

Habitat for Humanity has a restore and training facility for staff and volunteers.

An industrial park opened near I-96, the major corridor between Grand Rapids, Lansing and Detroit.

== Arts and culture ==
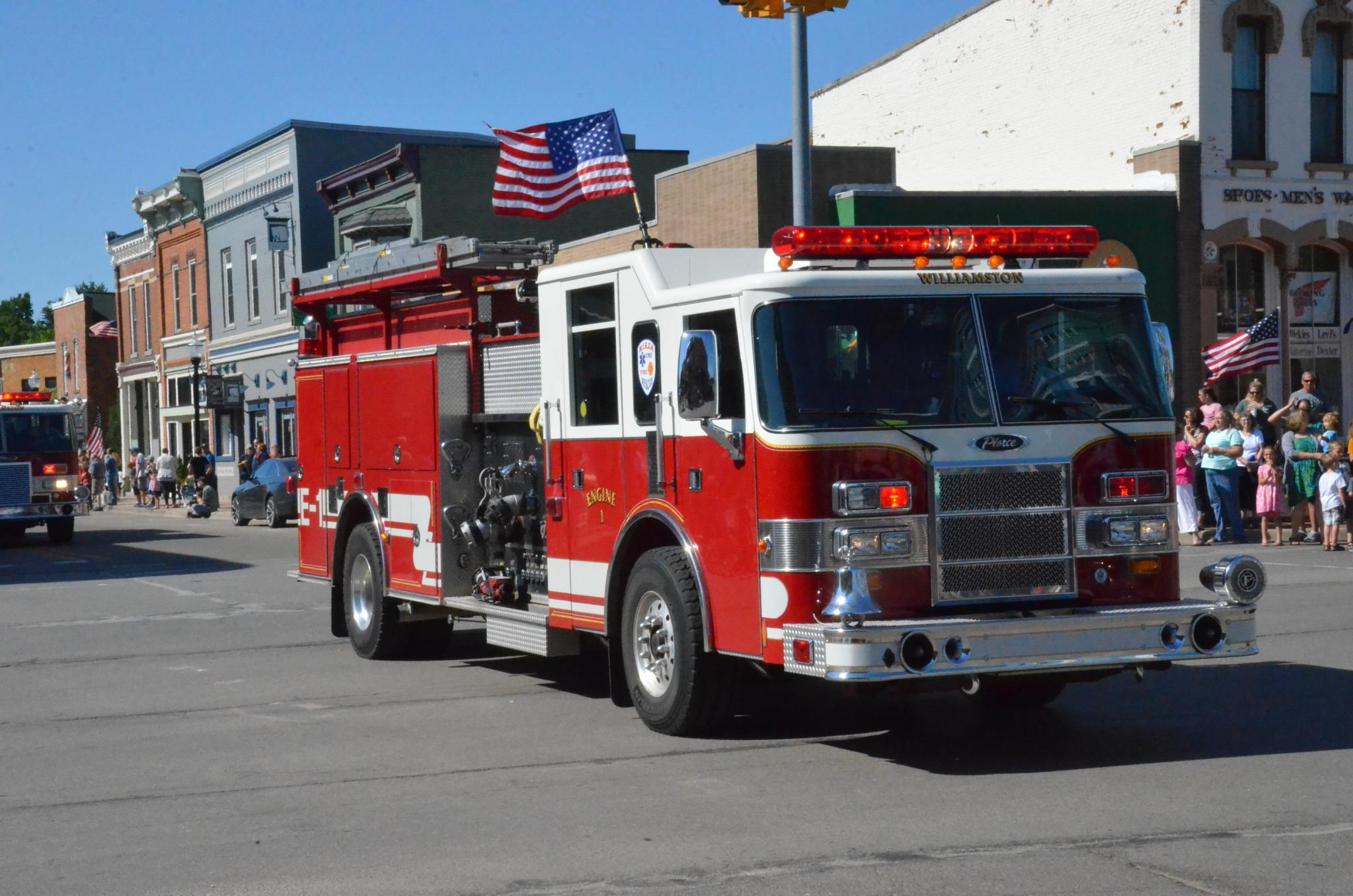
Memorial Day parade

A major event in town is the week-long festival known as the Red Cedar Jubilee. It typically begins the last week of June with a children's 'bike parade' through Williamston, and ends with the Boy Scout pancake breakfast on Sunday morning. Events of the Jubilee include a demolition derby, duck race, and chicken barbecue, as well as other events and games for children of all ages. The proceeds from some of the events go to benefit local community groups. One such group, the Red Cedar Jubilee Committee, runs a food and beverage tent during the festival.

Artfest on the River, was held in July each year at McCormick Park. The festival however, folded after seven years. The festival was scheduled to return in 2011, but was canceled and instead slated to return in 2012. As of 2013 ArtFest on the River returned and features vendors, free activities for children, and live music.

The first Thursday and Friday of August brings the Dog Days of Summer to Williamston. This event encourages area dog owners to bring their pets for activities including a pet parade, ugly dog contest, agility demonstrations, and Williamston's Deputy Dog contest. The Ingham County Animal Shelter conducts a pet adoption and fundraising drive during the festival.

The City of Williamston also sponsored a Labor Day 'Bridge Walk' annually. The former Mayor, Kenneth Zichi, led a group on a brief 1.5–2.5-mile-long (2.4–4.0 km) walking tour of town, pointing out sites of historic interest, and including a 'bridge crossing' of the Red Cedar River. Patterned after the 'Mackinac Bridge Walk' led by Michigan's governor, this was an opportunity to learn a bit more about the history and culture of a small town in Michigan, and enjoy the holiday.

On the first Saturday in December, the downtown hosts the annual Light Parade. Activities begin in the afternoon and culminate with a parade of lighted floats and vehicles through downtown Williamston. Afterward, children are given a chance to meet Santa Claus. Typically, stores and street booths sell hot drinks and musicians wander the street during the afternoon and evening. Occasionally, there is an ice sculpture or two spread throughout town.

In the Spring, Summer, and Fall, Williamston's Downtown Development Authority, Economic Development Corporation and City Government sponsor a weekly Farmers' Market in the downtown.

== Government ==
Williamston is governed by a seven-member City Council, and an appointed city manager. The City Council is responsible for all legislative and policymaking in Williamston. Elections are held every two years for four spots on the Council.

The Mayor and Mayor Pro-Tem of Williamston are chosen by Council from among its members at the last meeting of each calendar year.

The city has a Downtown Development Authority, Economic Development Corporation, and a Planning Commission.

== Education ==
Public education in Williamston and the surrounding area is provided by Williamston Community Schools. The schools consist of K-2 (Discovery Elementary) and 3-5 (Explorer Elementary), 6-8 (Williamston Middle), and 9-12 (Williamston High School).

The private schools of St. Mary School and Memorial Lutheran are located in Williamston and nearby Williamstown Township, respectively.

== Sources ==
- Durant, Samuel W. "History of Ingham and Eaton Counties Michigan". D. W. Ensign & Co. Philadelphia, 1880.
- Merrifield, Blanche Matthews; Lula Granger Howarth (1963). History of Williamston, 1838-1963.
