= Cynthia Frelund =

American television sports analyst

Cynthia Frelund (born August 24, 1983) is an American television sports analyst and writer who works for NFL Network, the broadcasting arm of the National Football League. A specialist in predictive analysis, Frelund has worked previously for ESPN and the NFL's League Office.

== Biography ==
=== Early years and education ===
Cynthia Frelund was born August 24, 1982, in Okemos, Michigan. She is a graduate of Okemos High School, where she lettered in soccer and volleyball. She grew up as a fan of the National Football League (NFL) and the star running back of the Detroit Lions, Barry Sanders.

After graduation from high school, Frelund enrolled in Boston College, from which she graduated with a Bachelor of Science degree in biology in 2005. Thereafter she enrolled in Northwestern University, from which she graduated with a Master of Business Administration degree in finance, entrepreneurship and innovation. She also holds a Master of Science degree in predictive analytics from Northwestern.

Following her collegiate studies, Frelund worked for three years as a financial analyst. From there she was hired by the league office of the NFL, where she held a position working as an analyst for the NFL's Chief Financial Officer, Anthony Noto.

At the league office, Frelund worked on projects like studying the potential costs and benefits of moving away from a schedule of four preseason games and 16 regular season games to a split of two and 18, the viability of moving a team to Los Angeles, and suggesting adaptations to the league's rookie pay scale.

=== Sports broadcast analyst ===
After leaving the league office, Frelund worked as a predictive analytics specialist for ESPN for nearly four years.

In August 2016 Frelund left ESPN to take a position with her primary employer, NFL Network. She has worked for NFL Network in a range of high-profile positions, including frequent appearances on such shows as NFL Fantasy Live and NFL GameDay Morning. She also writes a column called "Game Theory" for the NFL's official website.

In a 2018 interview with the Detroit Free Press, Frelund described her role as a sports journalist as "using analytics and combining that with information I gather from watching film, talking to people around the NFL, and former players I work with to come up with ways to help fans see the game through a different lens."

In the same interview, Frelund was careful to make a distinction between sports statistics and analytics:

"Statistics is seeing that two defensive ends had about the same number of sacks, but analytics can measure who is the better player of the two. That often has to do with what they are asked to do in the specific defenses they are in and how well they do it."

In conjunction with her job, Frelund makes use of computer modeling, writing her own code to generate thousands of simulations of each game, from which predictions can be derived.

From 2021 to 2023, Frelund worked as a sideline reporter on the preseason telecasts of the NFL's Buffalo Bills. At the time of her hiring, Mark Preisler, executive vice president of Pegula Sports and Entertainment, producer of the preseason telecasts, called Frelund a "rising star" and noted his company's desire to "get away from a typical sideline reporter" in favor of making use of an expert to add in-game commentary about "next gen stats and trends."

Frelund's association with the Bills was slated to continue through the 2021 season with at least one appearance a week on the team's One Bills Live program.

=== Personal ===
Frelund is a certified Pilates and group fitness instructor, gaining her credential in 2005.

Frelund is a lifelong fan of Detroit Lions.
