= Taylor Moton =

American football player (born 1994)

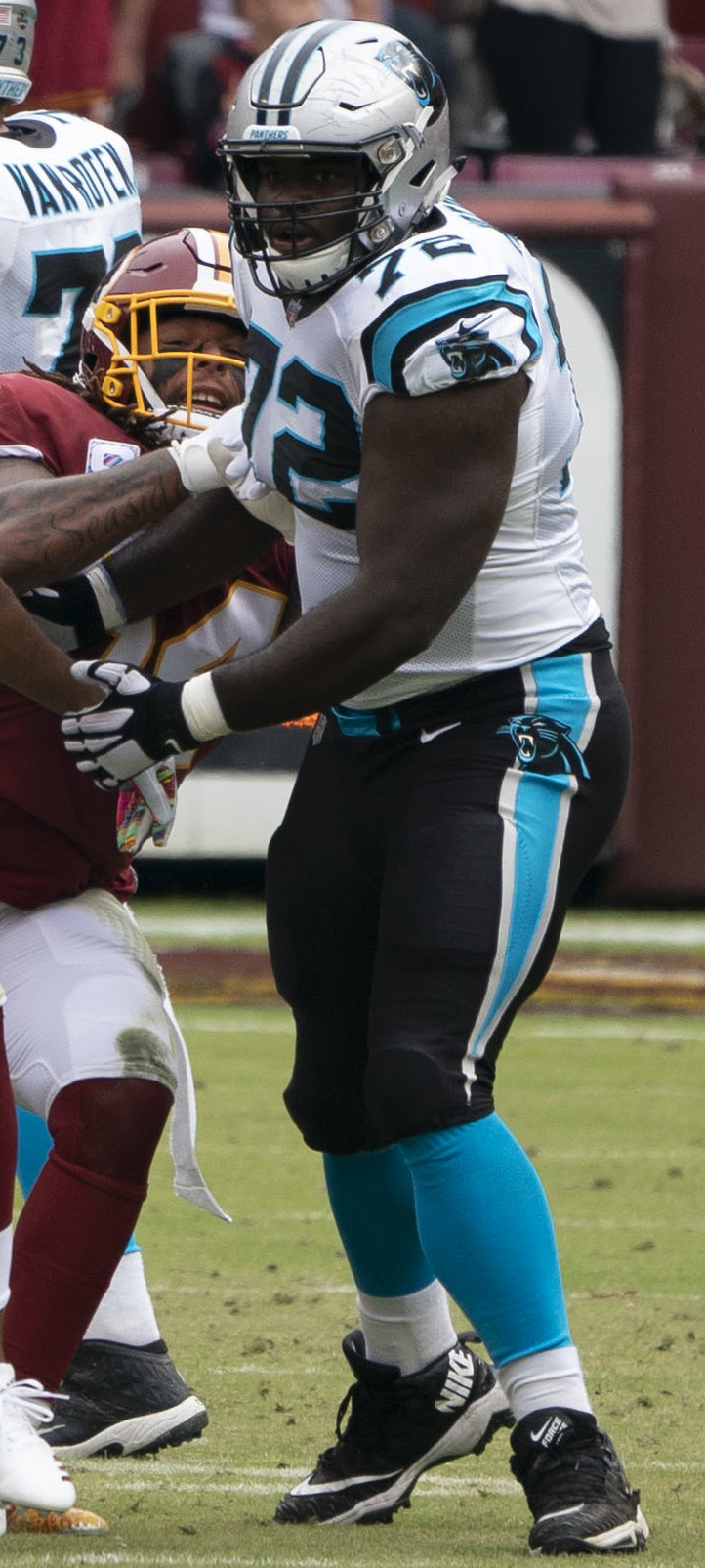
- Moton with the Carolina Panthers in 2018

No. 72 – Carolina Panthers
- Position: Offensive tackle
- Roster status: Injured reserve

Personal information
- Born: August 18, 1994 (age 32); Lansing, Michigan, U.S.
- Listed height: 6 ft 5 in (1.96 m)
- Listed weight: 316 lb (143 kg)

Career information
- High school: Okemos (Okemos, Michigan)
- College: Western Michigan (2012–2016)
- NFL draft: 2017: 2nd round, 64th overall pick

Career history
- Carolina Panthers (2017–present)

Awards and highlights
- First-team All-MAC (2016)

Career NFL statistics as of 2025
- Games played: 145
- Games started: 128
- Stats at Pro Football Reference

Taylor Moton (born August 18, 1994) is an American professional football offensive tackle for the Carolina Panthers of the National Football League (NFL). He played college football for the Western Michigan Broncos. He was selected by the Panthers in the second round of the 2017 NFL draft.

== Early life ==
Moton attended Okemos High School in Okemos, Michigan. He played football, basketball and ran track.

== College career ==
Moton played at Western Michigan from 2012 to 2016. During his career he set a school record with 52 career starts.

== Professional career ==
Moton received an invitation to the Senior Bowl and played offensive tackle for the North who lost 16–15 to the South. He attended the NFL Combine and completed all of the combine and positional drills. A dozen NFL scouts attended Western Michigan's Pro Day, as Moton only ran positional drills with 13 other prospects. NFL draft experts and analysts projected him to be a second or third round pick in the 2017 NFL draft. He was ranked the fourth best offensive tackle in the draft by NFL analyst Mike Mayock and was ranked the fifth best offensive tackle by Sports Illustrated, NFLDraftScout.com, and ESPN.

Pre-draft measurables
Height	Weight	Arm length	Hand span	Wingspan	40-yard dash	10-yard split	20-yard split	20-yard shuttle	Three-cone drill	Vertical jump	Broad jump	Bench press
6 ft 5 1/4 in (1.96 m)	319 lb (145 kg)	34 1/8 in (0.87 m)	10 5/8 in (0.27 m)	6 ft 10 1/8 in (2.09 m)	5.18 s	1.84 s	3.01 s	4.58 s	7.73 s	30.5 in (0.77 m)	9 ft 1 in (2.77 m)	23 reps
All values from NFL Combine

The Carolina Panthers selected Moton in the second round (64th overall) of the 2017 NFL Draft. The pick used to select Moton was acquired in a trade with the New England Patriots in a trade that sent Kony Ealy to the Patriots. On May 4, 2017, the Panthers signed Moton to a four-year, $4.15 million contract with $2.28 million guaranteed and a signing bonus of $1.16 million.

Moton was named the Panthers starting right tackle in 2018, and started every game the next three seasons.

Set to be an unrestricted free agent, the Panthers placed the franchise tag on Moton on March 9, 2021. He signed the one-year contract two days later. On July 15, 2021, Moton signed a four-year, $71.25 million contract extension with the Panthers, worth $43 million in guarantees.

On August 22, 2025, Moton signed a two-year, $44 million contract extension with the Panthers, making him a top-five paid right tackle in the NFL.

Moton began the 2026 season on the reserve/non-football illness list after being diagnosed with multiple blood clots in his lungs. He returned in Week 7 against the Tampa Bay Buccaneers, but suffered a fractured fibula in the game and was placed on injured reserve on October 26, 2026.
