= Lansing Sailing Club =

Founded in 1963, the Lansing Sailing Club is located on Lake Lansing in Haslett, Michigan near the capital city of Lansing. The club has an active program of sailboat racing, junior sailing camps, adult learn to sail programs and holiday events during a sailing season that extends from mid-April through mid-October. Fleets of Lasers, Lightnings, Wayfarer and Sunfish form the core of boats sailed by Club members. Lasers and Sunfish race on Wednesday evenings and Lightnings race on Sunday afternoons.

== External reference ==
Lansing Sailing Club Website
