= Lee Abramson =

American composer and musician

- Born: September 13, 1970; Lansing, Michigan, U.S.
- Died: January 20, 2016 (aged 45); Lansing, Michigan, U.S.
- Education: University of Michigan
- Occupation: Musician
- Known for: Use of adaptive technology in music

Lee Abramson (September 13, 1970 – January 20, 2016) was an American composer and musician. He was the first person to write music using ModelTalker, a computerized speech production program.

== Musical techniques and career ==
Abramson used adaptive technology, live musicians and electronic technology to create complex musical expressions, all with one finger. His music featured layers of electronic textures, synthesizers, piano, bass, and percussion. His music was used as a subject for study in a Michigan State University class. Because of his disability, which limited his ability to control a computer to the use of only one finger, Abramson wrote music one note at a time using software such as Sibelius, LogicPro, ModelTalker to use computer recordings of his voice to "sing" on songs, Keystrokes from Assistiveware as an on-screen keyboard.

Abramson produced an educational series of YouTube videos which explains the 5-step method of making music with ModelTalker, with a 6th video showing a real-time bounce of a Logic Pro project with ModelTalker samples "singing".

Tucker Stilley another musician with ALS, shared his custom KeyStrokes keyboard layout for Logic Pro, Abramson's digital audio workstation without which he said, "Would have made what I do impossible".

Prior to his physical illness, Abramson was the bassist for numerous small bands, including Violet Wine and Punchy. His recent creations are classified as Rumi music, where he set Rumi poetry to music. Abramson has performed under several pen name, including Ace NoFace, under which he wrote and produced the album Toxic Charm. In addition, under Rumi Music, he produced a self-titled album, Rumi Music and later, Vow to Silence.

== 2012 presidential campaign ==
Abramson ran for President of the United States as an independent candidate in the 2012 election. His candidacy was endorsed by The Daily Swarm. Abramson did not appear on any state ballots in that election.

== Education ==
Abramson attended Okemos High School, The Hebrew University of Jerusalem, and the University of Michigan. He took Music Marketing, Songwriting, Music Production at Berklee College of Music

== Other ventures ==
Abramson sold pork rinds on the internet from 1998 to 2000.

== Death ==
Abramson was diagnosed with amyotrophic lateral sclerosis in February 2005. He died on January 20, 2016, at the age of 45.

== Discography ==
- 2009 – Rumi Music
- 2010 – Vow To Silence
- 2011 – Spices
- 2012 – Abramsonium Review
- 2013 – The Antarctic Wars
- 2013 – Maize And Bluebeard
- 2014 - The Bionic Mouth
