= Perry Public Schools (Michigan) =

School district in Michigan

Address
- 2665 West Britton Road Perry, Shiawassee County, Michigan, 48872; United States

District information
- Motto: It's Possible at Perry
- Grades: PreKindergarten–12
- Superintendent: Dr. Lori Haven
- Schools: 3
- Budget: $19,268,000 2022-2023 expenditures
- NCES District ID: 2627900

Students and staff
- Students: 987 (2024-2025)
- Teachers: 60.19 (on an FTE basis) (2024-2025)
- Staff: 145.92 FTE (2024-2025)
- Student–teacher ratio: 16.4 (2024-2025)
- District mascot: Ramblers

Other information
- Website: www.perry.k12.mi.us

Perry Public Schools is a public school district in Central Michigan. In Shiawasee County, it serves Perry and parts of the townships of Bennington, Perry, and Woodhull. In Ingham County, it serves parts of the townships of Williamstown and Locke.

== History ==
The 1907 Perry High School yearbook describes the twelve-grade school as offering courses in Latin and German, manual training, and scientific studies using state-of-the-art laboratory equipment. Graduates of the school could attend several state universities without taking an exam.

Perry's old school building originally did not have a gymnasium, earning its sports teams the nickname "Ramblers" because their games were held at other towns' schools. A bond issue to fund construction of a gymnasium failed in 1929.

The former Perry High School was dedicated on November 23, 1958. Additions to the high school and a new elementary school were built in 1961.

The current high school opened in fall 1994. Initially, middle school students continued attending the former middle/high school. In 2004, voters approved a bond issue to build additions at the high school and rebuild much of the middle school, currently used as the Upper Elementary.

== Schools ==
Schools in Perry Public Schools district
School	Address	Notes
Perry Middle/High School	2555 West Britton Road, Perry	Grades 7–12. Built 1994.
Perry Upper Elementary	2775 West Britton Road, Perry	Grades 3–6.
Perry Elementary	401 North Watkins St., Perry	Grades K-2.
Early Childhood Education	401 North Watkins St., Perry	Preschool within Perry Elementary.
