= Williamston Community Schools =

School district in Michigan

Address
- 418 Highland Street Williamston, Ingham, Michigan, 48895; United States
- Coordinates: 42°41′32.7″N 84°16′30.0″W

District information
- Grades: Pre-Kindergarten-12
- Superintendent: Adam Spina, Ed.D
- Schools: 4
- Budget: $29,822,000 2022-2023 expenditures
- NCES District ID: 2636420

Students and staff
- Students: 1,879 (2024-2025)
- Teachers: 104.29 (on an FTE basis) (2024-2025)
- Staff: 245.71 FTE (2024-2025)
- Student–teacher ratio: 18.02 (2024-2025)

Other information
- Website: www.gowcs.net

Williamston Community Schools is a public school district in Ingham County, Michigan. It serves Williamston, part of Okemos, and parts of the townships of Alaiedon, Leroy, Locke, Meridian, Wheatfield and Williamstown. It is a member of the Ingham Intermediate School District.

== History ==
Williamston Community Schools began in 1874 as a large two story building in the center of town. This building was known as Williamston Grade School, and along with two additional school houses, this is what constituted Williamston Community Schools for a long period of time. The building received a large renovation and addition in the 1920s. When Explorer and the current middle school were built in the 1950s and 60s, the 8-12th grade building would become a middle school. The one-room school houses were auctioned off privately in the late 1990s and early 2000s. The original grade school building remained in operation until 1990, when it was replaced by a new Williamston High School building located on Vanneter Road. The original building would then provide space for the food bank, senior center, library, and some other services while being mostly neglected. The previous high school building was purchased and renovated by a non-profit organization in 2016 and renamed to the "Commons of Williamston" and is now home to several local businesses.

Williamston Middle School and Explorer Elementary were constructed in 1962 and 1953. Over time, they have received extensive renovations, and are still in use today. Williamston Middle School was originally the high school until the construction of the new high school in 1990. Discovery Elementary was constructed around the year 2000 and is the newest building in Williamston Community Schools. A bond was drafted in 2006 to construct a third elementary school, but this was rejected.

Williamston High School has received a couple major additions. In 1996-98, the public pool was added, and some new classrooms on the west and east sides of the building. The former outdoor public pool at Discovery Elementary was closed permanently and was filled in during 2016. In 2006, Granger Construction was contracted to expand Williamston High School. The building was expanded by 76,000 square feet, and featured a new gym, as well as a community fitness center open to students and the public. More classrooms were also added, allowing for the expansion of academic opportunities in the district, including the foundation of the WCS Math and Science Academy.

== Schools ==
Williamston Elementary schools, Explorer and Discovery, share a campus and their buildings are connected by a corridor.

Schools in Williamston Community Schools district
School	Address	Notes
Williamston High School	3939 Vanneter Road, Williamston	Grades 9–12
Williamston Middle School	3845 Vanneter Road, Williamston	Grades 6–8
Williamston Explorer Elementary	416 Highland Street, Williamston	Grades 3–5
Williamston Discovery Elementary	350 Highland Street, Williamston	Grades PreK–2
Preschool and Child Care	418 Highland Street, Williamston	Located on the elementary school campus
