= Bill Boyle =

American soccer coach

Personal information
- Place of birth: Michigan, United States

College career
Years	Team	Apps	(Gls)
1994–97	Hartwick Hawks		

Managerial career
- 2005–08: Olivet Comets (head coach)
- 2010: Michigan State Spartans (assistant coach)
- 2011–13: Colgate Raiders (assistant coach)
- 2014–15: Albany Great Danes (assistant coach)
- 2016–: Niagara Purple Eagles

Bill Boyle is an American soccer head coach and a former player. He holds a NSCAA's National Advanced License and USSF A Coaching License. He is the Niagara Purple Eagles men's soccer head coach since 2016.

== Coach ==
Boyle kicked off his coaching career at his alma mater, Okemos High School, in 2001. He also coached the U-16 Real Colorado Foxes boy's squad from 1999 to 2000, and served as the boys varsity head coach at Haslett High School in 2009.

He served as head coach at Division III Olivet College for four seasons, from 2005 to 2008, before joining the Michigan State Spartans men's soccer team as an assistant coach, working with the goalkeepers as well as directing the day-to-day operations of the team and scouting opponents in 2010. Boyle served as an assistant coach at Colgate University from 2011 to 2013, and at the University at Albany, SUNY from 2014 to 2015, before joining Niagara University as head coach in 2016.
