= Williamstown Township, Michigan =

- Civil township
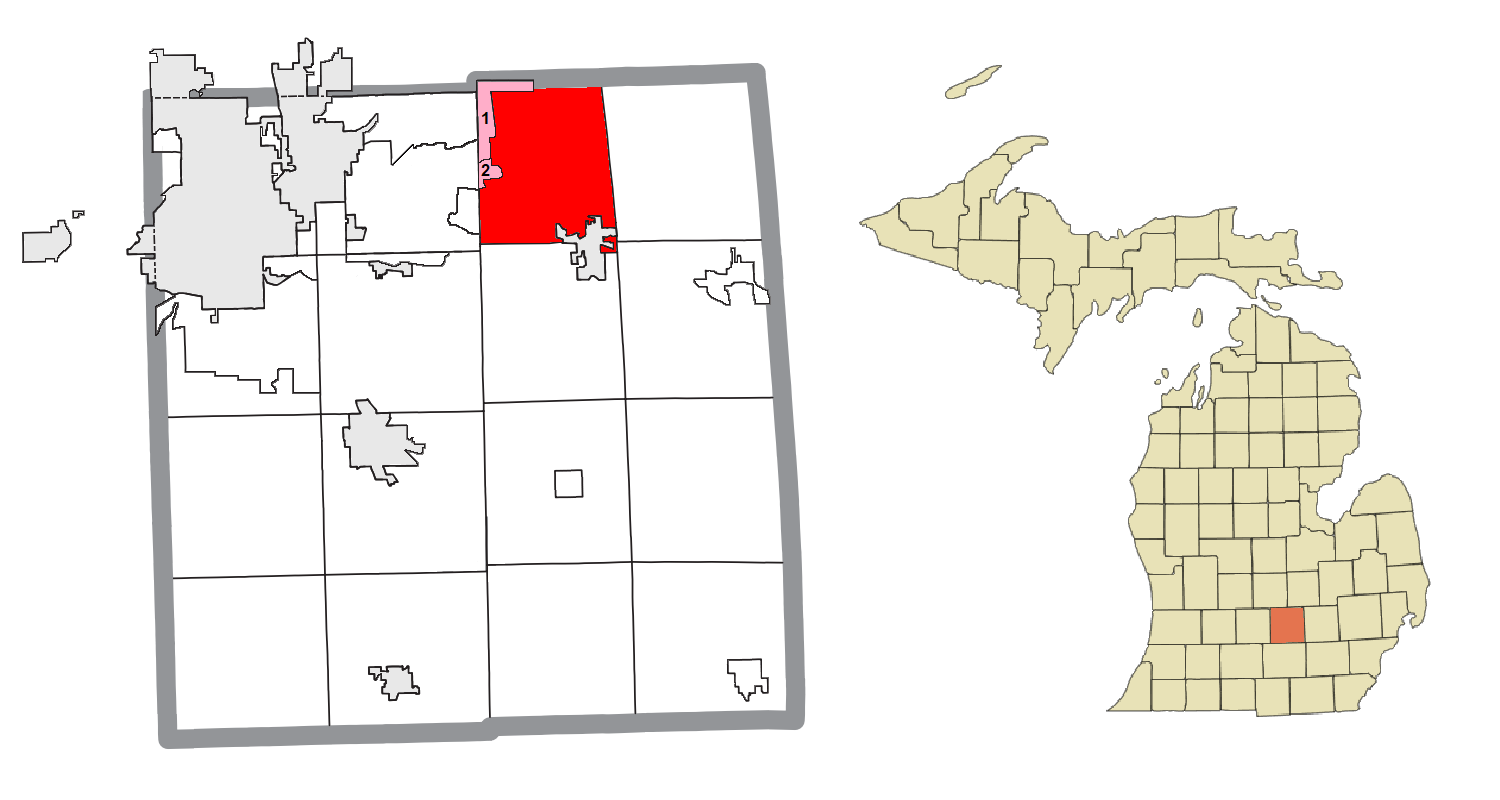
- Location within Ingham County and portions of the administered CDPs of Haslett (1) and Okemos (2)

- Location within the state of Michigan Location within the United States
- Coordinates: 42°43′21″N 84°18′39″W
- Country: United States
- State: Michigan
- County: Ingham
- Organized: 1839

Government
  - Supervisor: Ron Poth
  - Clerk: Robin Cleveland

Area
  - Total: 29.26 sq mi (75.78 km^{2})
  - Land: 29.09 sq mi (75.34 km^{2})
  - Water: 0.17 sq mi (0.44 km^{2})
- Elevation: 922 ft (281 m)

Population (2020)
  - Total: 5,286
  - Density: 181.7/sq mi (70.16/km^{2})
- Time zone: UTC-5 (Eastern (EST))
  - Summer (DST): UTC-4 (EDT)
- FIPS code: 26-87440
- GNIS feature ID: 1627275
- Website: Official website

Williamstown Township is a civil township of Ingham County in the U.S. state of Michigan. As of the 2020 census, the township population was 5,286. The city of Williamston occupies the southeast corner of the township, but the two are administered autonomously.

== Communities ==
- Africa was a section of Williamstown Township settled by the Webb family. They were vocal abolitionists, and other residents of the area called where they lived Africa.
- Alverson was the name of a post office in Williamstown Township. Samuel Alverson was a large landowner, and he became the first postmaster with his home serving as the post office in September 1852. The office closed in October 1867 and reopened in June 1868 with William Alverson as postmaster. It closed again in November 1874 but was reopened again in December 1874 and operated until January 1896.
- Haslett is an unincorporated community and census-designated place (CDP) with a small portion of the CDP extending east into township.
- Okemos is an unincorporated community and CDP with a small portion of the CDP extending east into the northern portion of the township.

== Geography ==
According to the United States Census Bureau, the township has a total area of 29.26 square miles (75.78 km^{2}), of which 29.09 square miles (75.34 km^{2}) is land and 0.17 square miles (0.44 km^{2}) (0.58%) is water.

== Demographics ==
As of the census of 2000, there were 4,834 people, 1,692 households, and 1,416 families residing in the township. The population density was 164.3 inhabitants per square mile (63.4/km^{2}). There were 1,732 housing units at an average density of 58.9 per square mile (22.7/km^{2}). The racial makeup of the township was 97.56% White, 0.62% African American, 0.19% Native American, 0.56% Asian, 0.12% from other races, and 0.95% from two or more races. Hispanic or Latino of any race were 1.03% of the population.

There were 1,692 households, out of which 40.0% had children under the age of 18 living with them, 75.9% were married couples living together, 5.0% had a female householder with no husband present, and 16.3% were non-families. 12.9% of all households were made up of individuals, and 4.0% had someone living alone who was 65 years of age or older. The average household size was 2.85 and the average family size was 3.12.

In the township the population was spread out, with 28.9% under the age of 18, 4.6% from 18 to 24, 24.6% from 25 to 44, 32.7% from 45 to 64, and 9.1% who were 65 years of age or older. The median age was 41 years. For every 100 females, there were 100.6 males. For every 100 females age 18 and over, there were 100.3 males.

The median income for a household in the township was $79,778, and the median income for a family was $86,169. Males had a median income of $54,647 versus $38,854 for females. The per capita income for the township was $30,710. About 1.4% of families and 2.0% of the population were below the poverty line, including 1.8% of those under age 18 and 3.4% of those age 65 or over.

== Education ==
The Williamston Community Schools serve most of Williamstown Township. However, portions of the township are also served by Haslett Public Schools in the northwest, Okemos Public Schools in the southwest, and Perry Public Schools in the northeast.

== Highways ==
- I-96 runs east–west about one mile (1.6 km) south of the township's southern boundary.
- M-43 run east–west through the southern portion of the township.
- M-52 runs south–north about two miles (3.2 km) east of the township's eastern boundary.
