= Okemos Public Schools =

School district in Michigan

Address
- 4406 Okemos Road Okemos, Ingham, Michigan, 48864; United States

District information
- Grades: PreK-12
- Superintendent: Matthew Olson
- Schools: 7
- Budget: US$75,981,000 (2022-23 expenditures)
- NCES District ID: 2626280

Students and staff
- Students: 4,651 (2024-2025)
- Teachers: 279.05 FTE (2024-2025)
- Staff: 580.63 on FTE basis (2024-2025)
- Student–teacher ratio: 16.67 (2024-2025)

Other information
- Website: www.okemosk12.net

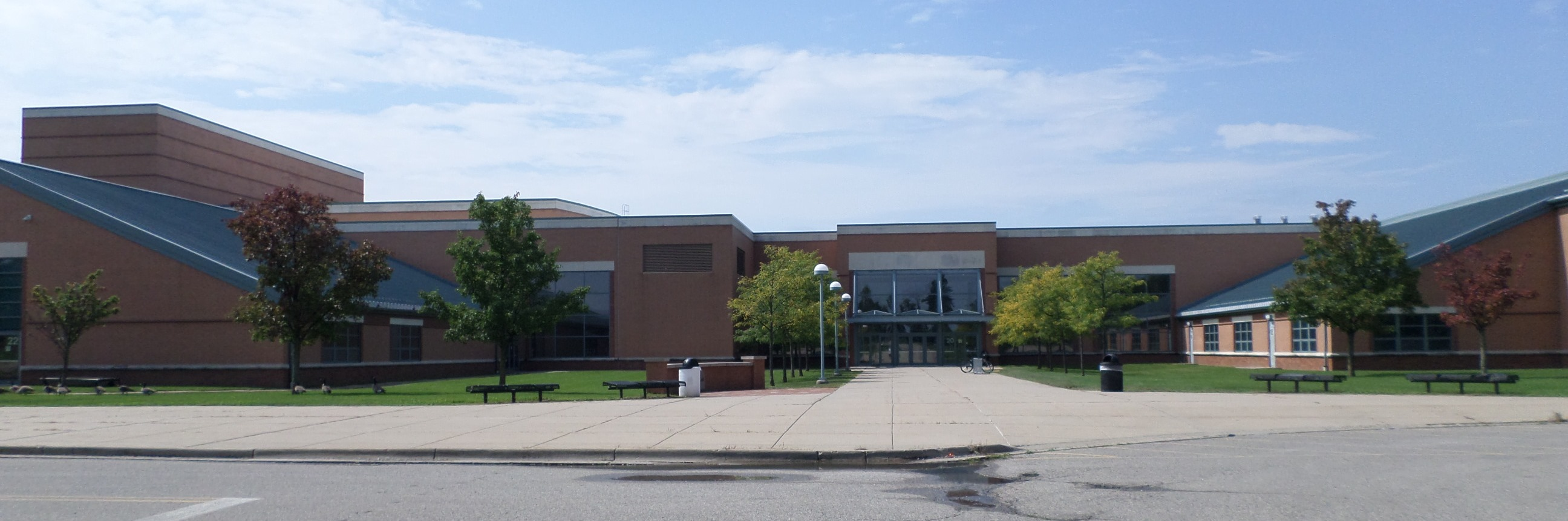
Okemos High School

Okemos Public Schools is a public school district in Ingham County, Michigan. It serves the census-designated place of Okemos, part of the city of East Lansing and portions of the township of Alaiedon, Meridian, and Williamstown.

Okemos Public Schools is ranked as the #6 best school district in Michigan by Niche as of 2022.

== History ==
Between 1920 and 1923, the district was housed in a wooden building built in 1870. It had an exterior fire escape slide attached to second floor. In May 1923, the school at 4406 Okemos Road (known as Central School) opened as the district's first school built after the district consolidated from ten small districts in 1920. It served as the high school until a new high school was built in 1960. An addition was built at the Central School in 1948, around which time the district stopped using the wooden school building.

The 1960 high school building was designed by the Lansing architecture firm Laitala and Neutchterlein Associates and had six individual buildings connected by canopies. The architect stated in the dedication pamphlet that "the total movability of partitions (including exterior walls) makes it possible to adapt to any conceivable educational situation which may arise. As opposed to conventional construction this high school will be completely adaptable to the educational needs for at least a century." Since opening, the buildings have been connected by interior spaces and reconfigured.

The present Okemos High School was built in 1994, and the former high school became Chippewa Middle School.

In 2009, the Okemos school board decided to reorganize the district's elementary and middle schools. One key objective was to close budget deficits resulting from lagging tax revenues and declining enrolments. Improvements sought to consolidate teaching to a few schools, allowing for more specialization among teachers at each grade level.

In 2010, Wardcliff and Edgewood Elementary Schools closed. Kindergarten to 4th grade students from Wardcliff and Central were reassigned to Cornell, Bennett Woods, and Hiawatha; and the public Montessori program moved to Central from Edgewood.

In 1989, a committee recommended phasing out the district's mascot, the Chieftains/Chiefs. During the 2010s, the district phased out the use of Native American imagery. In 2022, the district changed its mascot from the Chiefs to the Wolves.

As part of a bond issue passed in 2022, Chippewa and Kinawa Middle Schools will be reconstructed, with a planned opening date of 2028. Cornell Elementary will also be rebuilt.

== Schools ==
Schools in Okemos Public Schools district
School	Address	Notes
Bennett Woods Elementary School	2650 Bennett Road, Okemos	Grades PreK-4. Built 1993.
Cornell Elementary School	4371 Cornell Road, Okemos	Grades K-4. Built 1955.
Okemos Public Montessori	4406 Okemos Road, Okemos	PreK-4. Also houses district administration. Built 1923, southern addition built 1948.
Hiawatha Elementary School	1900 Jolly Road, Okemos	Grades K-4. Built 1988.
Chippewa 7-8 Middle School	4000 Okemos Road, Okemos	Grades 7-8. Formerly Okemos High School. Built 1960.
Kinawa 5-6 Middle School	1900 Kinawa Drive, Okemos	Grades 5-6. Built 1965.
Okemos High School	2800 Jolly Road, Okemos	Grades 9-12. Opened 1994.
