= Meridian Charter Township, Michigan =

Meridian Township, Michigan
- Charter township
- Charter Township of Meridian
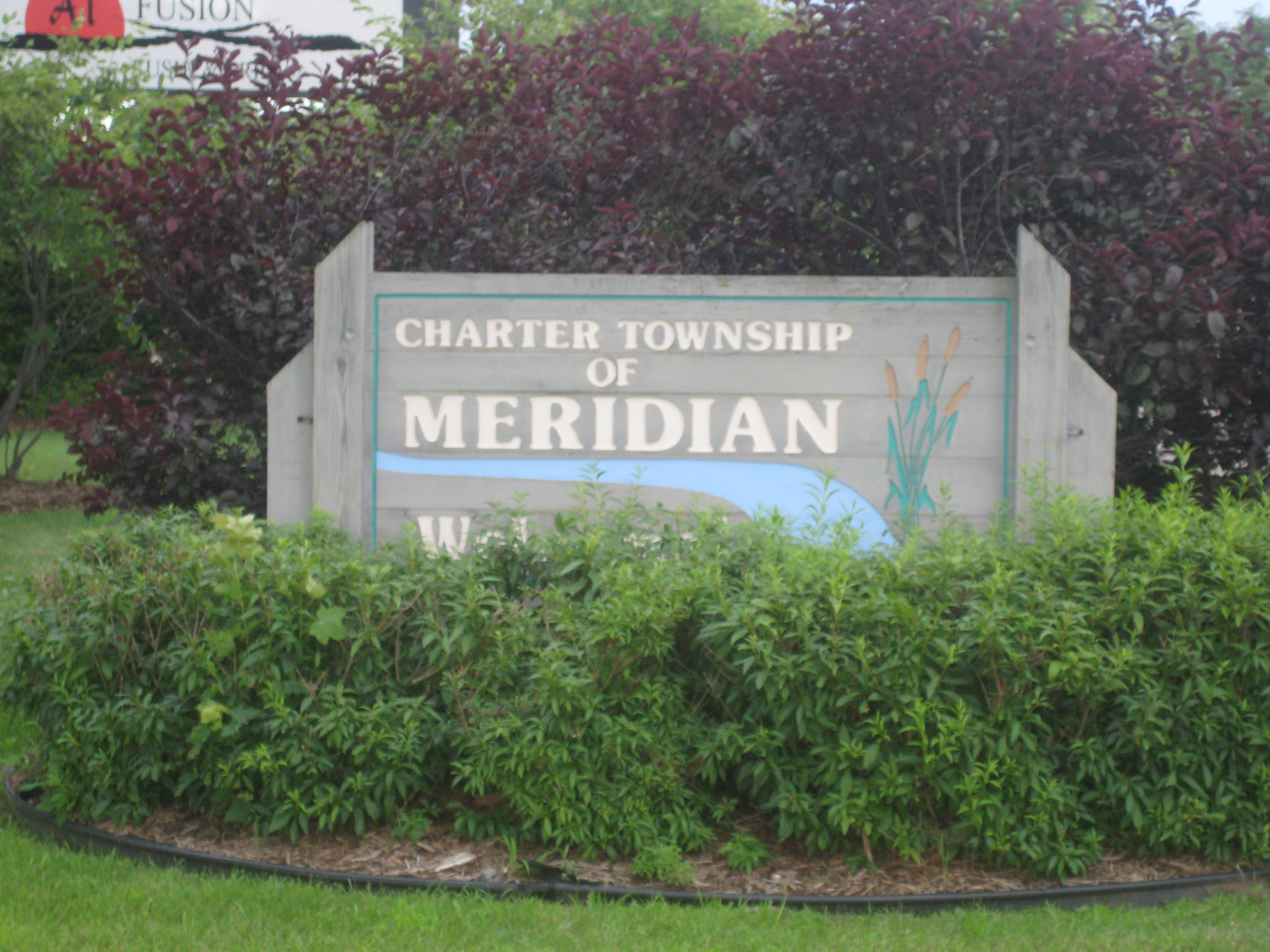
- Meridian Charter Township signage along M-43

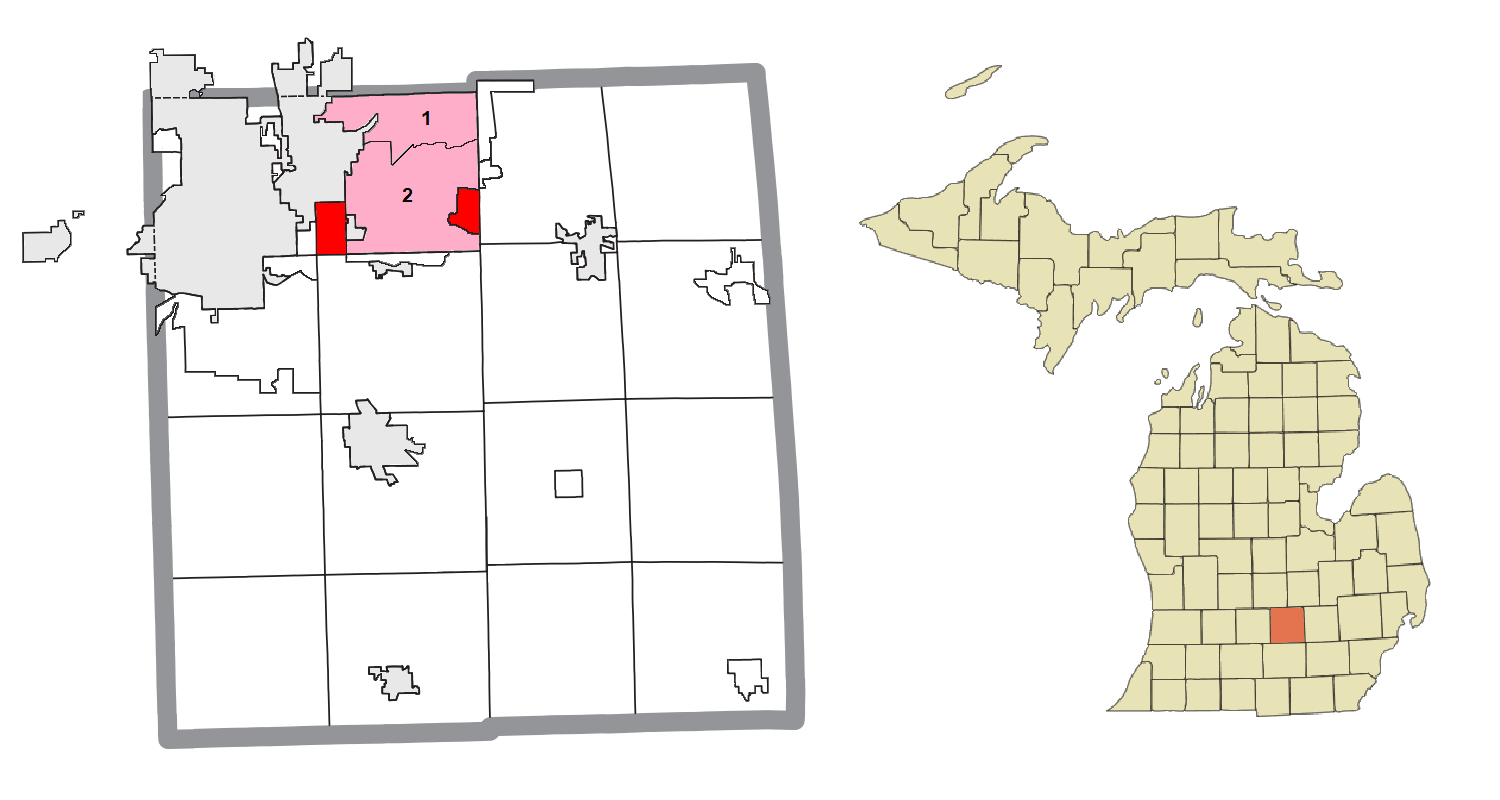
- Location within Ingham County and portions of the administered CDPs of Haslett (1) and Okemos (2)

- Location within the state of Michigan Location within the United States
- Coordinates: 42°43′37″N 84°24′54″W
- Country: United States
- State: Michigan
- County: Ingham
- Settled: 1836
- Organized: 1842

Government
  - Supervisor: Patricia Herring Jackson
  - Clerk: Deborah Guthrie

Area
  - Total: 31.57 sq mi (81.8 km^{2})
  - Land: 30.49 sq mi (79.0 km^{2})
  - Water: 1.08 sq mi (2.8 km^{2})
- Elevation: 850 ft (259 m)

Population (2020)
  - Total: 43,916
  - Density: 1,301.7/sq mi (502.6/km^{2})
- Time zone: UTC-5 (EST)
  - Summer (DST): UTC-4 (EDT)
- ZIP code(s): 48805, 48864 (Okemos); 48823 (East Lansing); 48840 (Haslett)
- Area code: 517
- FIPS code: 26-53140
- GNIS feature ID: 1626727
- Website: Official website

Meridian Charter Township is a charter township of Ingham County in the U.S. state of Michigan. As of the 2020 census, the township had a population of 43,916.

The township is named after the Michigan meridian, which comprises the eastern border of the township. The township contains the unincorporated communities of Haslett and Okemos. Bordering East Lansing to the west, Meridian Charter Township is the third-largest municipality within the Lansing–East Lansing metropolitan area.

== History ==
Meridian Township was first settled by pioneers in 1836. In November 1836, Obed Marshall purchased 180 acres (73 ha) of land near present-day Haslett. The earliest settlers located at Pine Lake (now Lake Lansing) and made use of the numerous stands of pines to build their cabin. The lake was later the site of a Spiritualist Meeting Camp led by John Haslett. During the late 19th century, the lake became known as a local vacation area served by an "interurban trolley" which ran from the City of Lansing to the resort on the south side of the lake. An amusement park was introduced and enjoyed immense popularity into the mid-20th century. Currently, the Village of Haslett is located at the south side of Lake Lansing.

The first settlers near the current Village of Okemos (to the south of the former Pine Lake) were Sanford Marsh and his wife who built their cabin in 1839. They were soon followed by Joseph Kilbourne, who took out land for his brother-in-law, Freeman Bray.

It was Bray who platted out the southeast corner of his land and sold the lots to newcomers traveling into the mid-state wilderness. The village was first known as Hamilton.

A post-office called Sanford was established in the spring of 1840. Joseph H. Kilbourne was the first postmaster.

A local Native American, Chief John Okemos, was well known throughout the area. The village area was one of his primary camping areas and he traveled frequently between the village and another campsite near present-day Portland, Michigan. In 1857, the Michigan Legislature changed the name of the village officially to Okemos to honor the old chief.

The Township is rich with history and one resident, Joseph Kilbourne, had a major role in the decision in 1847 to relocate the state capitol from Detroit to Lansing (then Lansing Township). A local organization, the Friends of Historic Meridian, has an archive of local historic information and also maintains the historic buildings in the Meridian Historical Village.

== Geography ==
According to the United States Census Bureau, the township has a total area of 31.57 square miles (81.8 km^{2}), of which 30.49 square miles (79.0 km^{2}) is land and 1.08 square miles (2.8 km^{2}) (3.42%) is water.

The Red Cedar River flows through the township.

== Demographics ==
Historical population
Census	Pop.	Note	%±
1960	13,884		—
1970	23,817		71.5%
1980	28,754		20.7%
1990	35,416		23.2%
2000	39,108		10.4%
2010	39,688		1.5%
2020	43,916		10.7%
2021 (est.)	43,988		0.2%
U.S. Census Bureau

As of the census of 2000, there were 39,116 people, 16,414 households, and 9,782 families residing in the township. The population density was 1,261.2 inhabitants per square mile (487.0/km^{2}). There were 17,120 housing units at an average density of 552.0 per square mile (213.1/km^{2}). The racial makeup of the township was 86.36% White, 4.05% African American, 0.32% Native American, 6.51% Asian, 0.05% Pacific Islander, 0.69% from other races, and 2.01% from two or more races. Hispanic or Latino of any race were 2.53% of the population.

There were 16,414 households, out of which 30.2% had children under the age of 18 living with them, 48.9% were married couples living together, 8.2% had a female householder with no husband present, and 40.4% were non-families. 29.1% of all households were made up of individuals, and 6.8% had someone living alone who was 65 years of age or older. The average household size was 2.36 and the average family size was 2.99.

In the township the population was spread out, with 23.7% under the age of 18, 13.4% from 18 to 24, 27.5% from 25 to 44, 25.4% from 45 to 64, and 10.0% who were 65 years of age or older. The median age was 35 years. For every 100 females, there were 91.5 males. For every 100 females age 18 and over, there were 87.6 males.

The median income for a household in the township was $55,203, and the median income for a family was $80,114. Males had a median income of $55,705 versus $39,306 for females. The per capita income for the township was $32,190. About 4.3% of families and 9.4% of the population were below the poverty line, including 6.9% of those under age 18 and 3.8% of those age 65 or over.

== Government ==
Meridian Township is governed under the Charter Township Act, which prescribes a 7-member board of trustees comprising a township supervisor, clerk, treasurer and 4 trustees. In addition, the township employs a township manager to oversee the day-to-day operations of the township, and who serves at the pleasure of the board.

On the Ingham County Board of Commissioners, the township is split between the 13th, 14th, and 15th districts. In the Michigan legislature, the township lies in the 73rd and 75th state house districts, and the 28th state senate district. At the federal level, the township is included within Michigan's 7th congressional district.

== Education ==
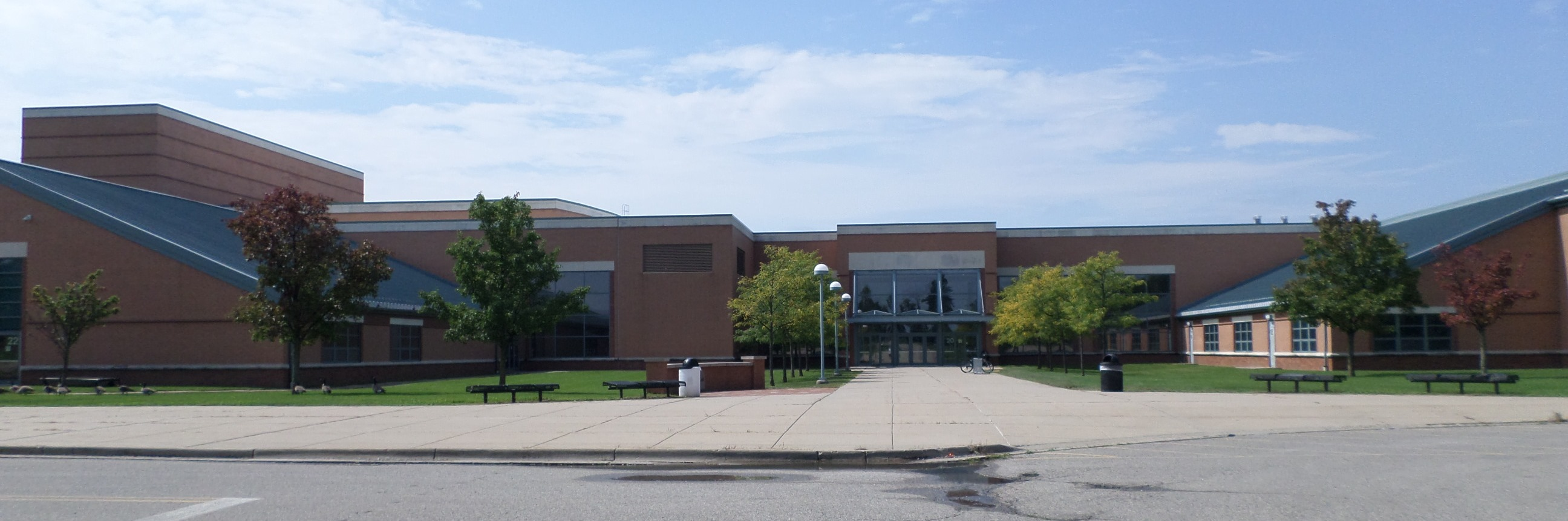
Okemos High School

Much of the township is in Okemos Public Schools and Haslett Public Schools. Portions are in East Lansing School District and Williamston Community Schools.

Okemos Public Schools facilities in the township include Bennett Woods Elementary School, Cornell Elementary School, Hiawatha Elementary School, Okemos Public Montessori at Central, Kinawa 5-6 School (formerly Kinawa Middle School), Chippewa Middle School, and Okemos High School. Wardcliff Elementary School, an OPS school which was in the township, began operations in 1955 and closed in 2010.

The Haslett district operates the following in the township: Wilkshire Early Childhood Center, Murphy Elementary School, Vera Ralya Elementary School, Haslett Middle School, and Haslett High School. The East Lansing district operates Donley Elementary School.

Additionally, there is a private school, Montessori Radmoor School a.k.a. Michigan Montessori School.

Parts of Michigan State University extend into this township. The Beef Cattle Teaching & Research Center, the Sheep Teaching & Research Center, and the Swine Teaching & Research Center's main swine farm are in the township.
