= Dansville Schools =

School district in Michigan

Address
- 1264 Adams Street Dansville, Ingham County, Michigan, 48819; United States

District information
- Grades: PreKindergarten–12
- Established: 1847
- Superintendent: Jennifer Wonnell
- Schools: 3
- Budget: $10,781,000 2021-2022 expenditures
- NCES District ID: 2611400

Students and staff
- Students: 726 (2024-2025)
- Teachers: 47 (on an FTE basis) (2024-2025)
- Staff: 117.75 FTE (2024-2025)
- Student–teacher ratio: 15.45 (2024-2025)
- District mascot: Aggies

Other information
- Website: www.dansville.org

Dansville Schools is a public school district in Ingham County, Michigan. It serves Dansville and parts of the townships of Bunker Hill, Ingham, Leroy, Leslie, Stockbridge, Vevay, Wheatfield and White Oak.

== History ==
Dansville school district was established in 1847, and it had a high school by at least 1892.

The current Dansville School was built in sections, with the first part built in 1921. An annex for the elementary grades was built around 1955. The school became overcrowded in the early 1970s and in fall 1974, the high school and middle school shared the school on a half-day basis. A new high school addition was built around 1977 and expanded in 1995.

A 2016 bond issue funded substantial rebuilding of the 1921 section, which was torn down due to the cost of continuing to maintain it, and the middle school students from that part of the building moved to the former high school section. The new high school section opened in fall 2018.

== Schools ==
Dansville Schools are in interconnected sections of a building at 1264 Adams Street in Dansville.

Schools in Dansville Schools district
School	Notes
Dansville High School	Grades 9-12
Dansville Middle School	Grades 6-8
Dansville Elementary	Grades PreK-5
