= Leslie Township, Michigan =

- Civil township
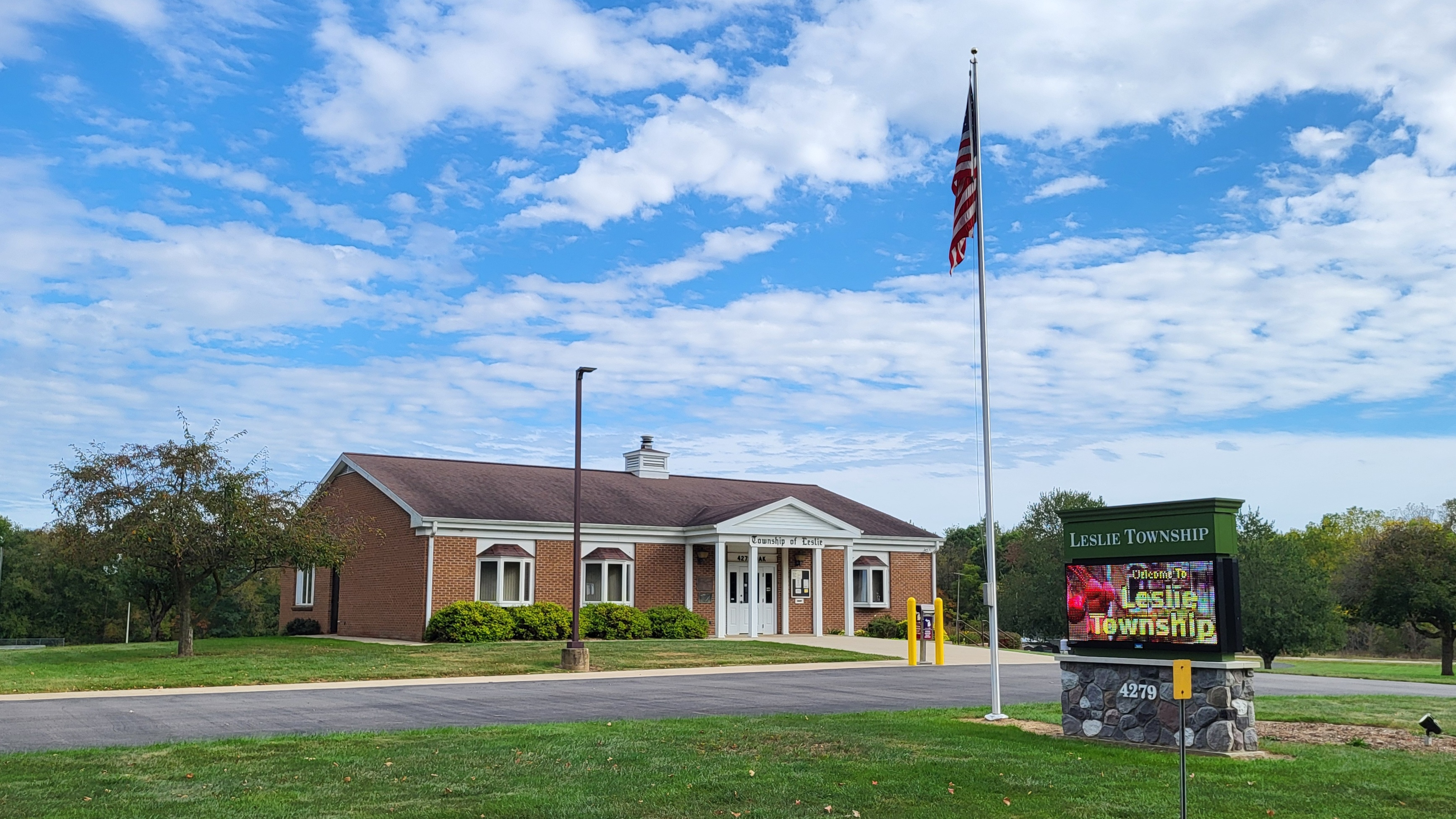
- Leslie Township Offices

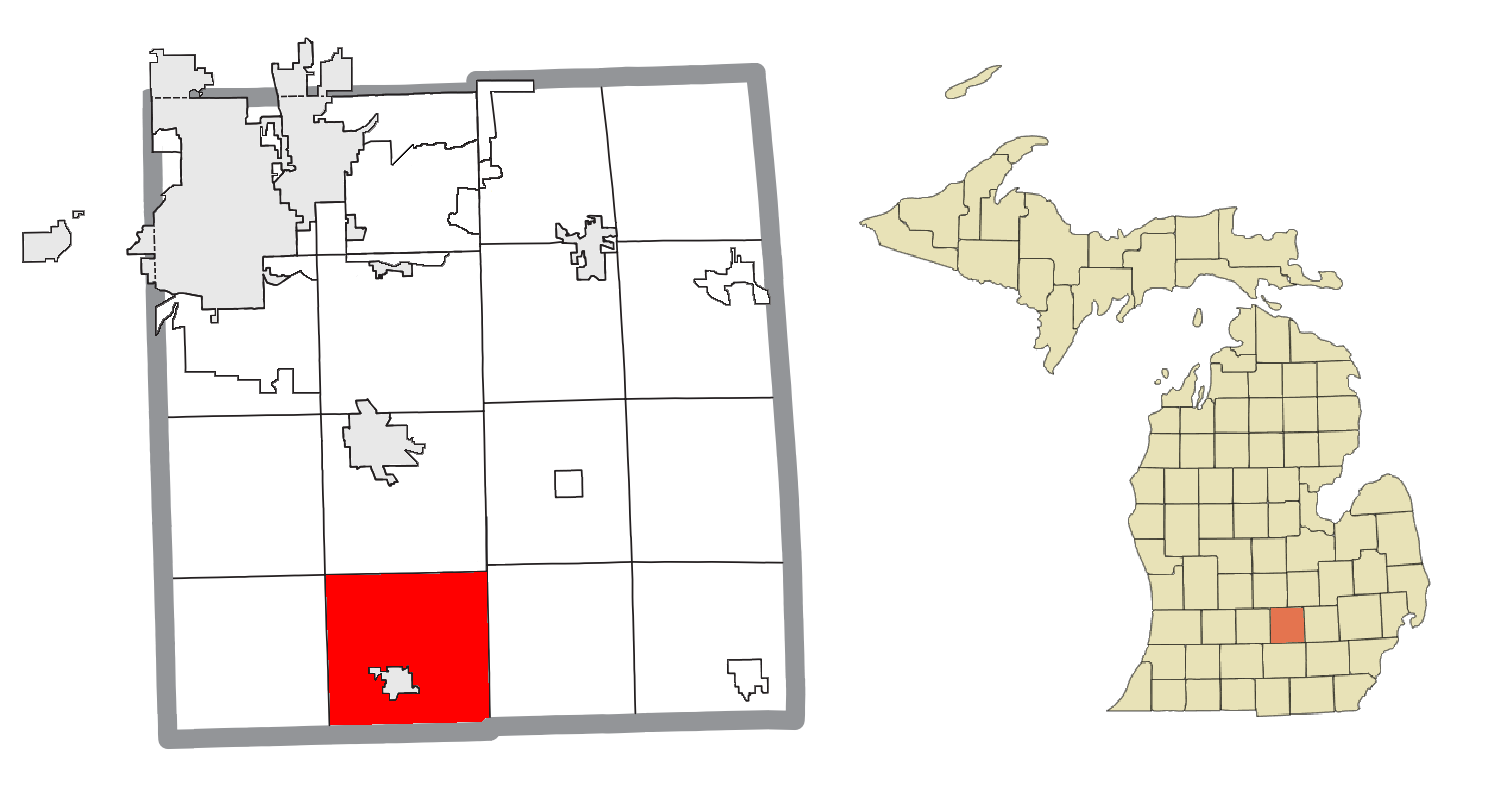
- Location within Ingham County

- Location within the state of Michigan Location within the United States
- Coordinates: 42°27′57″N 84°25′23″W
- Country: United States
- State: Michigan
- County: Ingham
- Established: 1836

Government
  - Supervisor: Dallas Henney
  - Clerk: Lynn Lankton

Area
  - Total: 35.05 sq mi (90.78 km^{2})
  - Land: 34.90 sq mi (90.39 km^{2})
  - Water: 0.15 sq mi (0.39 km^{2})
- Elevation: 948 ft (289 m)

Population (2020)
  - Total: 2,305
  - Density: 66/sq mi (25/km^{2})
- Time zone: UTC-5 (Eastern (EST))
  - Summer (DST): UTC-4 (EDT)
- ZIP code(s): 48854 (Mason); 49251 (Leslie)
- Area code: 517
- FIPS code: 26-47200
- GNIS feature ID: 1626611
- Website: Official website

Leslie Township is a civil township of Ingham County in the U.S. state of Michigan. The population was 2,305 at the 2020 census. The township completely surrounds the city of Leslie, but the two are administered autonomously. The township was officially organized and recognized December 30, 1837.

== Geography ==
According to the United States Census Bureau, the township has a total area of 35.05 square miles (90.78 km^{2}), of which 34.90 square miles (90.39 km^{2}) is land and 0.15 square miles (0.39 km^{2}) (0.43%) is water.

Sycamore Creek has its headwaters in the township.

The highest point in Ingham County, Teaspoon Hill, is in Leslie Township just off of Covert Rd near US-127. It is just over 1,000' above sea level.

== Demographics ==
As of the census of 2000, there were 2,327 people, 855 households, and 670 families residing in the township. The population density was 66.5 inhabitants per square mile (25.7/km^{2}). There were 879 housing units at an average density of 25.1 per square mile (9.7/km^{2}). The racial makeup of the township was 97.29% White, 0.39% African American, 0.17% Native American, 0.09% Asian, 1.03% from other races, and 1.03% from two or more races. Hispanic or Latino people of any race were 1.72% of the population.

There were 855 households, out of which 33.0% had children under the age of 18 living with them, 69.0% were married couples living together, 5.6% had a female householder with no husband present, and 21.6% were non-families. 16.0% of all households were made up of individuals, and 6.2% had someone living alone who was 65 years of age or older. The average household size was 2.72 and the average family size was 3.03.

In the township the population was spread out, with 25.3% under the age of 18, 6.6% from 18 to 24, 30.9% from 25 to 44, 27.4% from 45 to 64, and 9.8% who were 65 years of age or older. The median age was 38 years. For every 100 females, there were 98.9 males. For every 100 females age 18 and over, there were 98.9 males.

The median income for a household in the township was $55,476, and the median income for a family was $58,789. Males had a median income of $43,068 versus $28,510 for females. The per capita income for the township was $23,179. About 4.4% of families and 6.7% of the population were below the poverty line, including 6.1% of those under age 18 and 5.4% of those age 65 or over.
