= Brutus Township, Michigan =

1939-1941 township in Ingham County, Michigan

Brutus Township was a township in Ingham County, Michigan from 1839 until 1841. In 1841 it was divided into Leroy Township and Wheatfield Township.

== Sources ==
- Romig, Walter (1986). Michigan Place Names. Detroit: Wayne State University Press. p. 84. ISBN 978-0-8143-1838-6 – via Google Books.
