= Sycamore Creek (Michigan) =

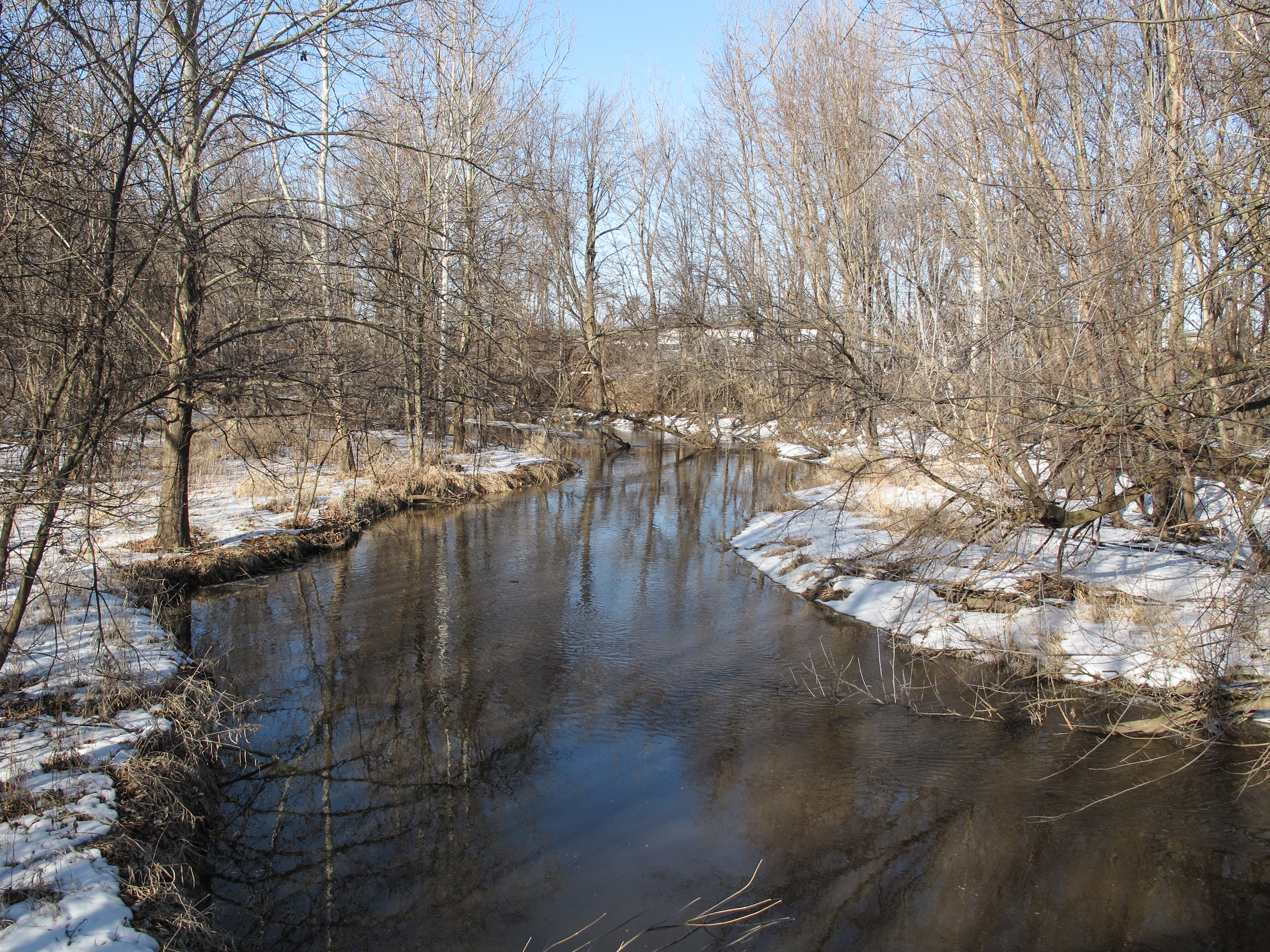
- Sycamore Creek in Lansing

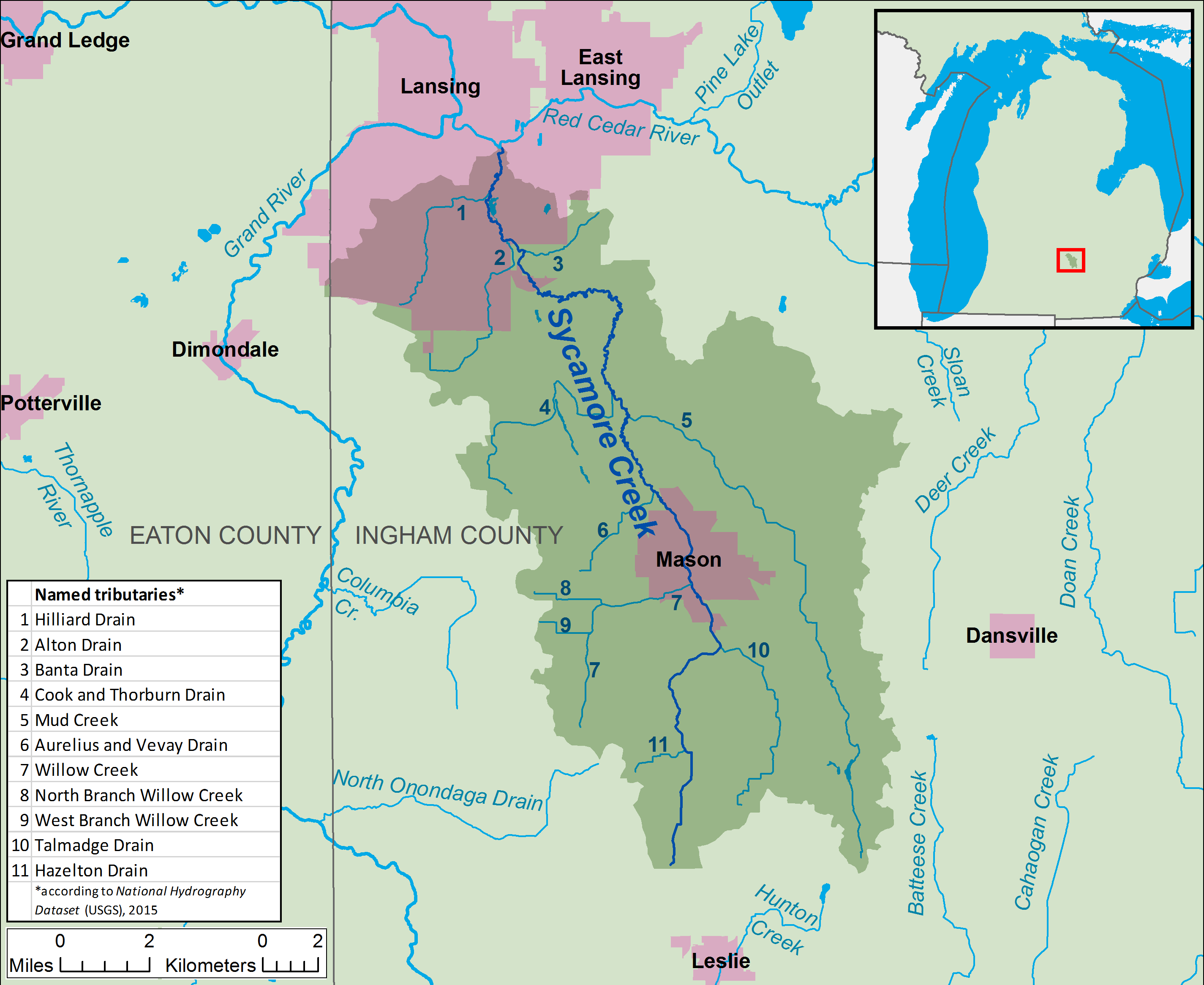
- A map of Sycamore Creek and its watershed.

Location
- Country: United States
- State: Michigan
- County: Ingham
- Townships: Leslie, Vevay, Alaiedon, Delhi
- Municipalities: Mason, Lansing

Physical characteristics
- Source
  - location: Leslie Township
  - coordinates: 42.481981°N 84.453583°W
  - elevation: 973 ft (297 m)
- Mouth: Red Cedar River
  - location: Lansing
  - coordinates: 42.7142018°N 84.5283112°W
  - elevation: 820 ft (250 m)
- Length: 26.5 mi (42.6 km)
- Basin size: 106.1 sq mi (275 km^{2})
- Discharge
  - location: mouth
  - average: 88.34 cu ft/s (2.502 m^{3}/s) (estimate)

Basin features
- Hydrologic Unit Codes: 040500040505, 040500040506, 040500040507 (USGS)

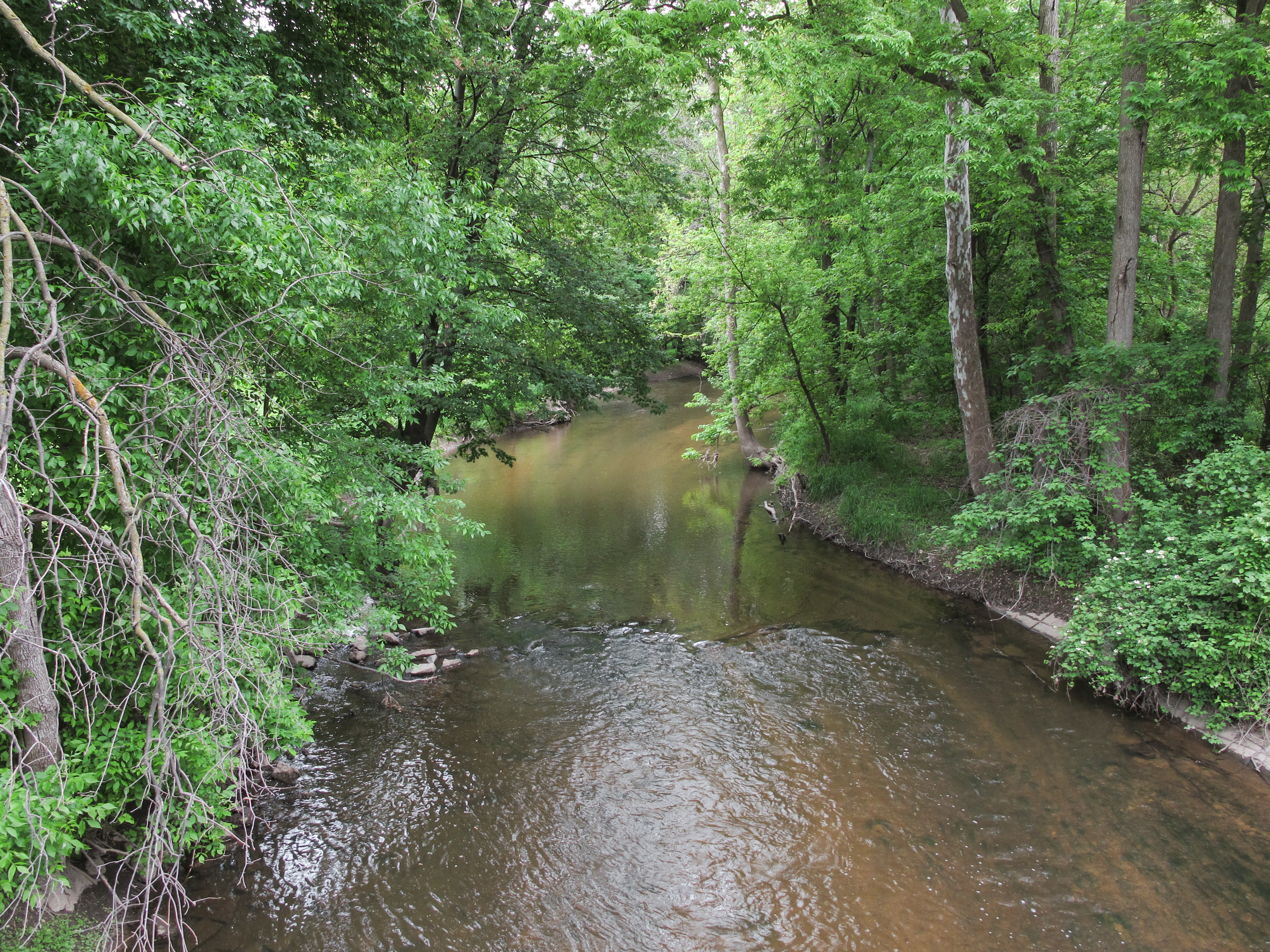
Sycamore Creek in Lansing

Sycamore Creek is a tributary of the Red Cedar River in the state of Michigan in the United States. The stream is 26.5 miles (42.6 km) long and drains an area of 106.1 square miles (275 km^{2}) on the central Lower Peninsula, in and around the city of Lansing. Via the Red Cedar River, it is part of the watershed of the Grand River, which flows to Lake Michigan. Via Lake Michigan and the Great Lakes system, it is part of the larger watershed of the St. Lawrence River.

Sycamore Creek flows for its entire length in Ingham County. It begins in Leslie Township, approximately 2.4 miles (3.9 km) northwest of the city of Leslie, and flows generally north-northwestward through Leslie and Vevay townships; the city of Mason; Alaiedon and Delhi townships; and the southeastern part of the city of Lansing. It flows into the Red Cedar River in Lansing, 1.6 miles (2.6 km) upstream of the Red Cedar River's mouth at the Grand River.

== Watershed characteristics ==
The Sycamore Creek watershed consists of three HUC-12 subwatersheds, as defined by the United States Geological Survey:

Name	HUC-12 code	Area
Headwaters Sycamore Creek	040500040506	49 square miles (130 km^{2})
Mud Creek	040500040505	31 square miles (80 km^{2})
Sycamore Creek	040500040507	26.1 square miles (68 km^{2})

Terrain in the Sycamore Creek watershed is generally rolling, with hilly and swampy sections. According to a watershed management plan for the Red Cedar River submitted in 2015 by the Michigan State University Institute of Water Research (IWR), the Sycamore Creek watershed had a population of approximately 72,975 at the 2010 census, (Note: populations of 16,068 in the Headwaters Sycamore Creek subwatershed; 4,594 in the Mud Creek subwatershed; and 52,313 in the [lower] Sycamore Creek subwatershed.) with most of that population living in the lower (northern) part of the watershed, which includes part of the city of Lansing and nearby urbanized areas. Land use in the watershed as of 2006 was as follows:

Land use	Percentage	Area
Agriculture	30% (Note: 38% agriculture in the 49 square miles (130 km^{2}) of the Headwaters Sycamore Creek subwatershed; 38% in the 31 square miles (80 km^{2}) of the Mud Creek subwatershed; and 5% in the 26.1 square miles (68 km^{2}) of the [lower] Sycamore Creek subwatershed.)	31.7 square miles (82 km^{2})
Developed	30% (Note: 22% developed in the 49 square miles (130 km^{2}) of the Headwaters Sycamore Creek subwatershed; 6% in the 31 square miles (80 km^{2}) of the Mud Creek subwatershed; and 72% in the 26.1 square miles (68 km^{2}) of the [lower] Sycamore Creek subwatershed.)	31.4 square miles (81 km^{2})
Shrubland/grassland, including grazing	21% (Note: 24% shrubland/grassland, including grazing, in the 49 square miles (130 km^{2}) of the Headwaters Sycamore Creek subwatershed; 28% in the 31 square miles (80 km^{2}) of the Mud Creek subwatershed; and 6% in the 26.1 square miles (68 km^{2}) of the [lower] Sycamore Creek subwatershed.)	22 square miles (57 km^{2})
Wetland	10% (Note: 8% wetland in the 49 square miles (130 km^{2}) of the Headwaters Sycamore Creek subwatershed; 13% in the 31 square miles (80 km^{2}) of the Mud Creek subwatershed; and 9% in the 26.1 square miles (68 km^{2}) of the [lower] Sycamore Creek subwatershed.)	10.3 square miles (27 km^{2})
Forest	9% (Note: 6% forest in the 49 square miles (130 km^{2}) of the Headwaters Sycamore Creek subwatershed; 14% in the 31 square miles (80 km^{2}) of the Mud Creek subwatershed; and 7% in the 26.1 square miles (68 km^{2}) of the [lower] Sycamore Creek subwatershed.)	9.1 square miles (24 km^{2})

A survey conducted for the same IWR report found approximately 2,478 large farm animals living in the watershed. (Note: 1794 farm animals in the Headwaters Sycamore Creek subwatershed; 684 in the Mud Creek subwatershed; and 0 in the [lower] Sycamore Creek subwatershed.) Approximately 2,504 homes in the watershed were serviced by septic systems as of 2012. (Note: 1159 septic systems in the Headwaters Sycamore Creek subwatershed; 654 in the Mud Creek subwatershed; and 691 in the [lower] Sycamore Creek subwatershed.)

Recreational trails have been built alongside or near portions of the creek in Mason (the Hayhoe Riverwalk), Delhi Township (the Sycamore Trail), and Lansing (the southern part of the Lansing River Trail).

== Tributaries ==
This is a list of named streams in the Sycamore Creek watershed, as identified by the National Hydrography Dataset. The list's default order is from the mouth of the creek to its source.

	Name	Flows into	Length
1	Hilliard Drain	Sycamore Creek	4.3 miles (6.9 km)
2	Alton Drain	Sycamore Creek	5 miles (8.0 km)
3	Banta Drain	Sycamore Creek	2.2 miles (3.5 km)
4	Cook and Thorburn Drain	Sycamore Creek	6.6 miles (10.6 km)
5	Mud Creek	Sycamore Creek	13.9 miles (22.4 km)
6	Aurelius and Vevay Drain	Sycamore Creek	2.9 miles (4.7 km)
7	Willow Creek	Sycamore Creek	5.2 miles (8.4 km)
8	North Branch Willow Creek	Willow Creek	1.8 miles (2.9 km)
9	South Branch Willow Creek	Willow Creek	1.4 miles (2.3 km)
10	Talmadge Drain	Sycamore Creek	5.5 miles (8.9 km)
11	Hazelton Drain	Sycamore Creek	1.5 miles (2.4 km)

== See also ==
- List of rivers of Michigan
