= Bunker Hill Township, Michigan =

- Civil township
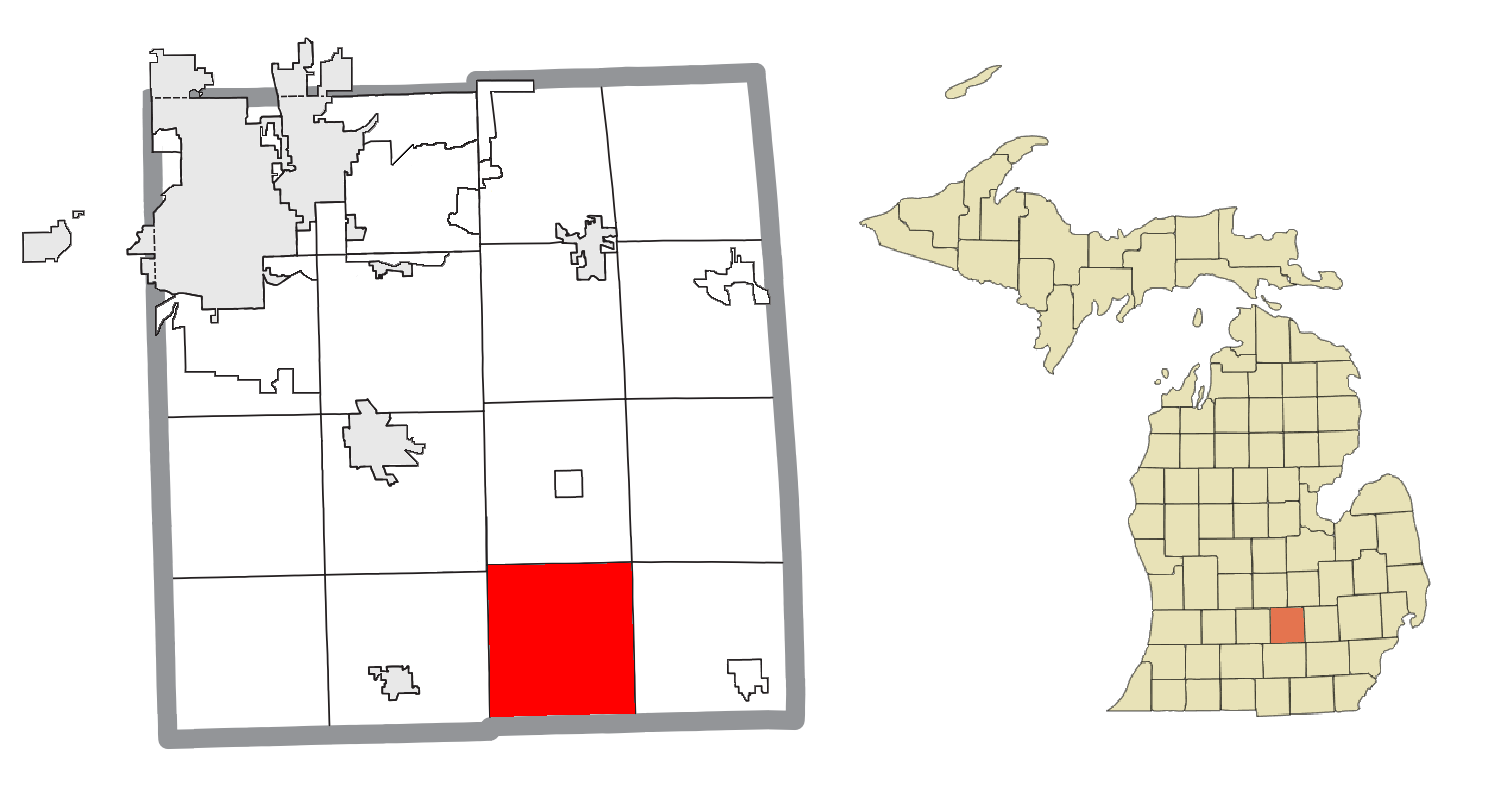
- Location within Ingham County

- Location within the state of Michigan Location within the United States
- Coordinates: 42°27′44″N 84°19′14″W
- Country: United States
- State: Michigan
- County: Ingham
- Established: 1839

Government
  - Supervisor: Gene Ulrey
  - Clerk: Carrie Zeitz

Area
  - Total: 32.93 sq mi (85.29 km^{2})
  - Land: 32.88 sq mi (85.16 km^{2})
  - Water: 0.062 sq mi (0.16 km^{2})
- Elevation: 938 ft (286 m)

Population (2020)
  - Total: 1,966
  - Density: 59.7/sq mi (23.05/km^{2})
- Time zone: UTC-5 (Eastern (EST))
  - Summer (DST): UTC-4 (EDT)
- ZIP code(s): 48819 (Dansville); 49251 (Leslie); 49285 (Stockbridge)
- Area code: 517
- FIPS code: 26-11640
- GNIS feature ID: 1626001
- Website: Official website

Bunker Hill Township is a civil township of Ingham County in the U.S. state of Michigan. As of the 2020 census, the township population was 1,966. The township is a rural area in central Michigan.

The community is heavily agricultural and local industries include small farms, campgrounds, and Amish businesses.

== History ==
Bunker Hill Township was established in 1839 by Irish settlers. There are two variations on the origin of the community's name. One allegation is that the town was named for founder Major Johnathan Shearer's father who fought in the famous Battle of Bunker Hill, while another story states that it was named for early settler Abram Bunker.

The village of Bunker Hill held a post office from 1841 to 1842, and from 1848 to 1903. There were also multiple businesses such as a blacksmith, mercantile, churches, school, and a town hall. To the west of Bunker Hill, a small community referred to as Felts or Felt Plains held a post office from 1851 to 1975 and as well as a small schoolhouse. In nearby Fitchburg, there were several small establishments, a post office, and a school.

== Communities ==
- Bunkerhill is an unincorporated community near the center of the township at 42°28′32″N 84°19′03″W.
- Fitchburg is an unincorporated community in the southeast corner of the township at 42°26′21″N 84°16′40″W. It was founded in 1848.

== Geography ==
According to the United States Census Bureau, the township has a total area of 32.93 square miles (85.29 km^{2}), of which 32.88 square miles (85.16 km^{2}) is land and 0.06 square miles (0.16 km^{2}) (0.18%) is water.

A little less than half of the Dansville State Game Area, managed by the Michigan Department of Natural Resources, lies in the north portion of the township on the boundary with Ingham Township. The Dansville State Game Area is a large area open to hunting and outdoor recreation covering approximately 4,800 acres of forest, open space, and wetlands.

Batteese Creek passes through the township from north to south, emptying in Batteese Lake to the south of Bunker Hill in Henrietta Township, Jackson County.

== Demographics ==
As of the census of 2020, there were 1,966 people residing in the township in 764 households.

64.5% of households were married couples with children, 17% were single male households with no spouse/partner, and 13% were single female households with no spouse/partner. 28.6% of households consist of grandparents as main caretakers for grandchildren, with 100% of these households being female grandparents. The average household size is

94% of the population graduated from high school or above, and 20% of the population has received a Bachelor's Degree or higher. 5% of the population received an education that ended between 9th and 12th grade.

99.2% of the Bunker Hill Township population was born in the United States.

The median income of households according to the US Census is $76,500, with the mean per capita income of $41,920.
