= Ingham Township, Michigan =

- Civil township
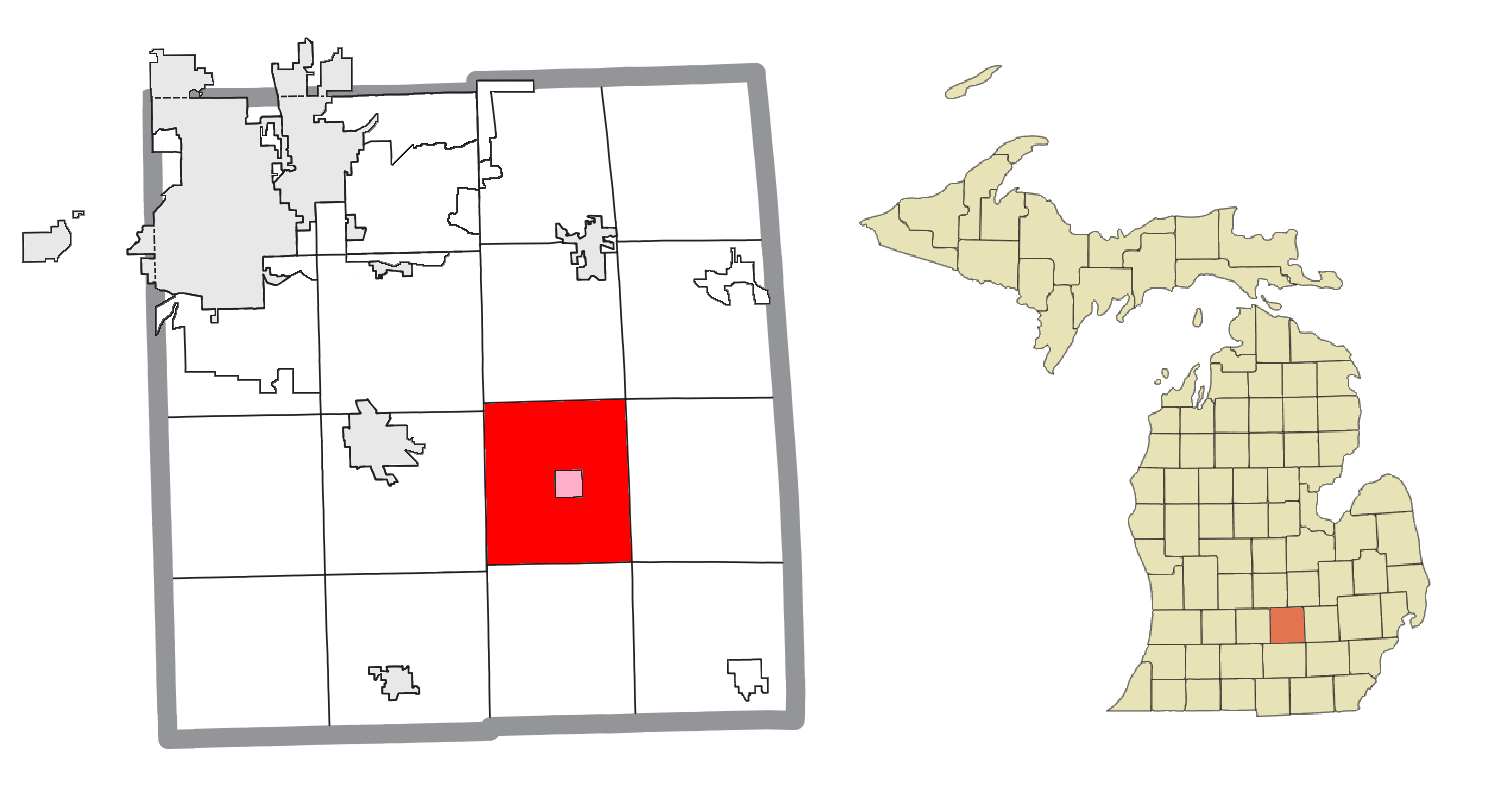
- Location within Ingham County (red) and the administered village of Dansville (pink)

- Location within the state of Michigan Location within the United States
- Coordinates: 42°33′25″N 84°18′26″W
- Country: United States
- State: Michigan
- County: Ingham

Government
  - Supervisor: Vernon Elliott
  - Clerk: Kathy LaGrow

Area
  - Total: 32.72 sq mi (84.74 km^{2})
  - Land: 32.67 sq mi (84.61 km^{2})
  - Water: 0.050 sq mi (0.13 km^{2})
- Elevation: 971 ft (296 m)

Population (2020)
  - Total: 2,401
  - Density: 73.50/sq mi (28.38/km^{2})
- Time zone: UTC-5 (Eastern (EST))
  - Summer (DST): UTC-4 (EDT)
- ZIP code(s): 48819 (Dansville); 48854 (Mason)
- Area code: 517
- FIPS code: 26-40640
- GNIS feature ID: 1626515
- Website: Official website

Ingham Township is a civil township of Ingham County in the U.S. state of Michigan. The population was 2,401 at the 2020 census.

== Communities ==
- The village of Dansville is near the center of the township on M-36 just southeast of the city of Mason.

== Geography ==
According to the United States Census Bureau, the township has a total area of 32.72 square miles (84.74 km^{2}), of which 32.67 square miles (84.61 km^{2}) is land and 0.05 square miles (0.13 km^{2}) (0.15%) is water.

Slightly more than half of the Dansville State Game Area is in the south of the township on the boundary with Bunker Hill Township.

== Demographics ==
As of the census of 2000, there were 2,061 people, 722 households, and 581 families residing in the township. The population density was 63.1 inhabitants per square mile (24.4/km^{2}). There were 737 housing units at an average density of 22.6 per square mile (8.7/km^{2}). The racial makeup of the township was 97.23% White, 0.10% African American, 0.49% Native American, 0.29% Asian, 0.58% from other races, and 1.31% from two or more races. Hispanic or Latino of any race were 1.41% of the population.

There were 722 households, out of which 38.9% had children under the age of 18 living with them, 69.0% were married couples living together, 7.6% had a female householder with no husband present, and 19.4% were non-families. 15.4% of all households were made up of individuals, and 5.1% had someone living alone who was 65 years of age or older. The average household size was 2.85 and the average family size was 3.18.

In the township the population was spread out, with 27.3% under the age of 18, 6.5% from 18 to 24, 32.1% from 25 to 44, 25.3% from 45 to 64, and 8.9% who were 65 years of age or older. The median age was 37 years. For every 100 females, there were 97.8 males. For every 100 females age 18 and over, there were 96.7 males.

The median income for a household in the township was $56,741, and the median income for a family was $59,107. Males had a median income of $40,852 versus $28,000 for females. The per capita income for the township was $21,348. About 2.4% of families and 3.3% of the population were below the poverty line, including 1.3% of those under age 18 and 13.8% of those age 65 or over.
