= Ingham County, Michigan =

County in Michigan, United States

- County
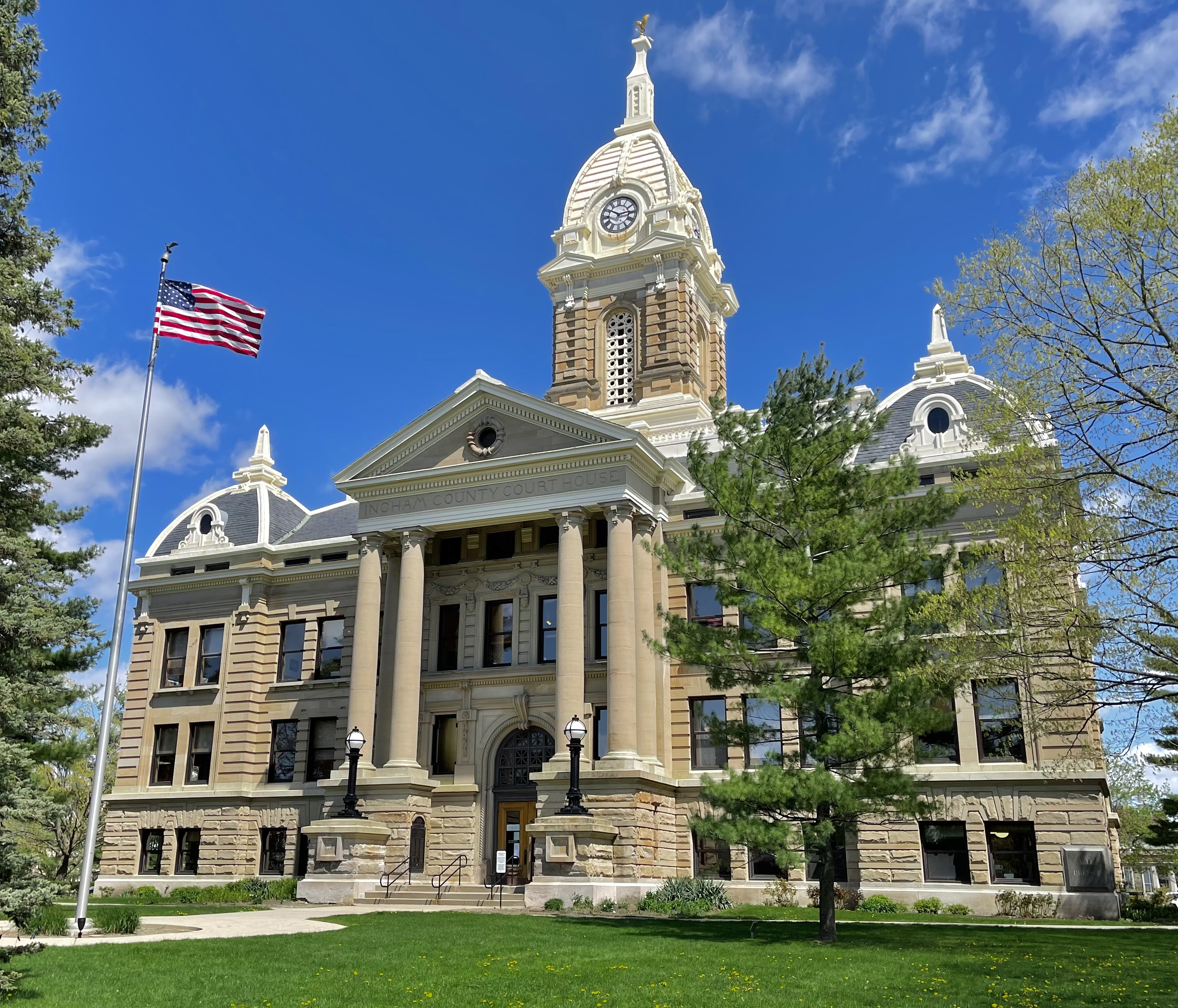
- Ingham County Courthouse

- Seal Logo

- Location within the U.S. state of Michigan
- Coordinates: 42°36′N 84°22′W
- Country: United States
- State: Michigan
- Founded: October 29, 1829 (created); 1838 (organized)
- Named for: Samuel D. Ingham
- Seat: Mason
- Largest city: Lansing

Area
  - Total: 561 sq mi (1,450 km^{2})
  - Land: 556 sq mi (1,440 km^{2})
  - Water: 4.6 sq mi (12 km^{2}) 0.8%

Population (2020)
  - Total: 284,900
  - Estimate (2025): 289,709 ▲
  - Density: 512/sq mi (198/km^{2})
- Time zone: UTC−5 (Eastern)
  - Summer (DST): UTC−4 (EDT)
- Congressional district: 7th
- Website: ingham.org

Ingham County (/ˈɪŋəm/ ING-um) is a county located in the U.S. state of Michigan. As of the 2020 Census, the population was 284,900. The county seat is Mason. Lansing, the state capital of Michigan, is largely located within the county. Lansing is the only state capital in the United States which is not also the seat of its county government. The county is home to Michigan State University, Lansing Community College, and the Class A minor league baseball team Lansing Lugnuts. Ingham County is included in the Lansing–East Lansing metropolitan area. It is considered to be a part of Mid Michigan.

== History ==
Ingham County was established by an act of the Michigan Territorial Legislature on October 29, 1829, from portions of Shiawassee County, Washtenaw County and unorganized territory. It was attached for administrative purposes to Washtenaw County until 1838 when county government was established for Ingham.

The county was named for Samuel D. Ingham, the U.S. Secretary of the Treasury under President Andrew Jackson, making Ingham one of Michigan's so-called Cabinet counties.

== Geography ==
According to the U.S. Census Bureau, the county has a total area of 561 square miles (1,450 km^{2}), of which 556 square miles (1,440 km^{2}) is land and 4.6 square miles (12 km^{2}) (0.8%) is water.

The county consists of gently rolling hills with an elevation ranging between 800 and 1,000 feet above sea level. The highest point in the county is the top of Teaspoon Hill rising to a height of 1,056 feet above sea level 1.5 miles north of Leslie.

The Grand River winds northward along the western boundary of the county and the Red Cedar River flows west across the northern section into the Grand River in Lansing. Most of the midsection of the county drains to the north into the Red Cedar River and the northern tier of townships drain to the south into the Cedar. The Sycamore Creek, flowing northwest into the Red Cedar in Lansing, drains much of the midsection of the county. Most of the southern portion of the county drains south or west into the Grand River. The southeastern corner drains to the southeast into the Huron River via the Portage Creek and Portage River and a series of small lakes.

=== Adjacent counties ===
- Shiawassee County (northeast)
- Livingston County (east)
- Washtenaw County (southeast)
- Jackson County (south)
- Eaton County (west)
- Clinton County (north)

== Demographics ==
Historical population
Census	Pop.	Note	%±
1840	2,498		—
1850	8,631		245.5%
1860	17,435		102.0%
1870	25,268		44.9%
1880	33,676		33.3%
1890	37,666		11.8%
1900	39,818		5.7%
1910	53,310		33.9%
1920	81,554		53.0%
1930	116,587		43.0%
1940	130,616		12.0%
1950	172,941		32.4%
1960	211,296		22.2%
1970	261,039		23.5%
1980	275,520		5.5%
1990	281,912		2.3%
2000	279,320		−0.9%
2010	280,895		0.6%
2020	284,900		1.4%
2025 (est.)	289,709	▲	1.7%
U.S. Decennial Census; 1790–1960 1900–1990; 1990–2000 2010–2019

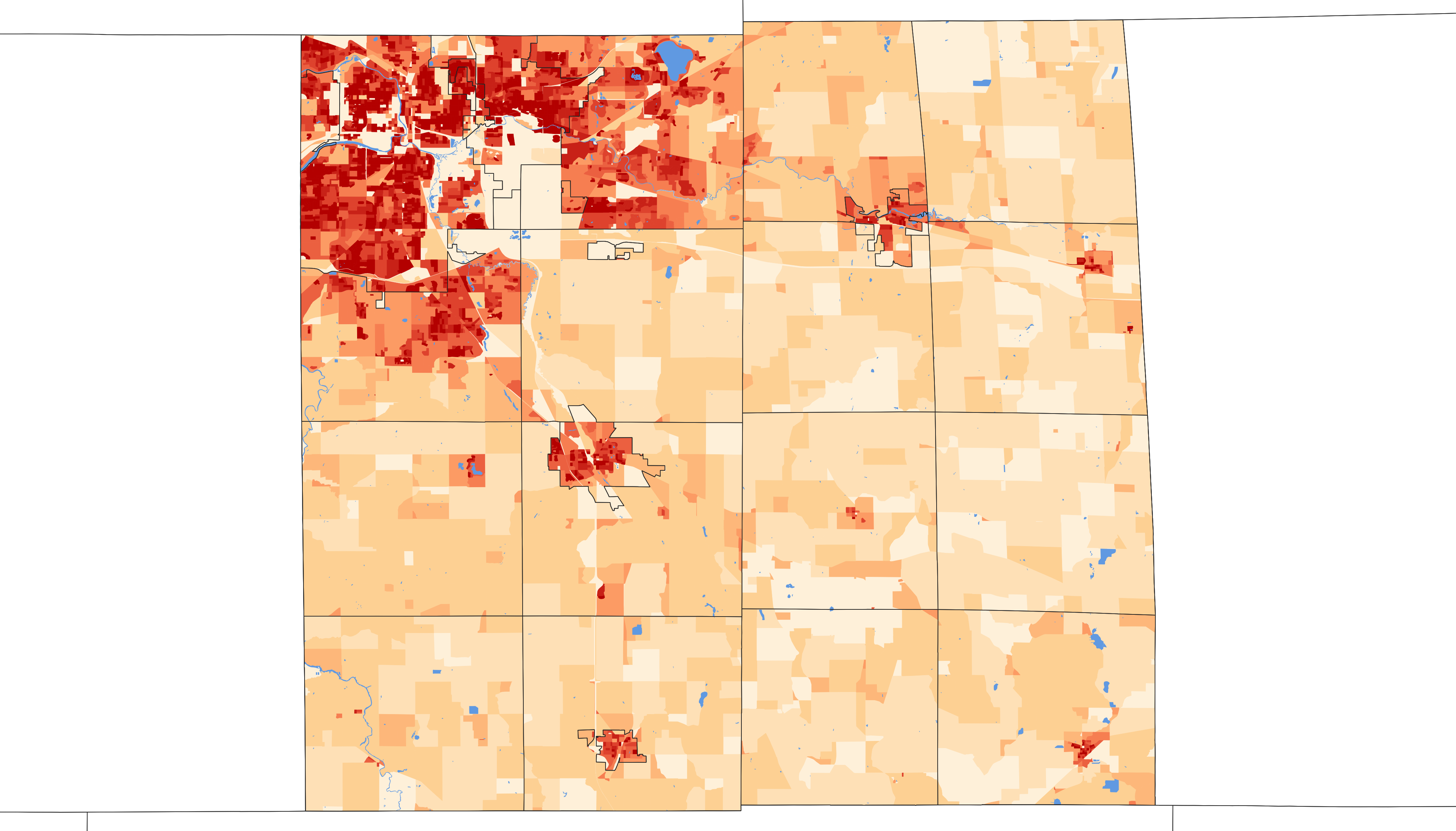
2020 population density of Ingham County MI by census block

=== Racial and ethnic composition ===
Ingham County, Michigan – Racial and ethnic composition Note: the US Census treats Hispanic/Latino as an ethnic category. This table excludes Latinos from the racial categories and assigns them to a separate category. Hispanics/Latinos may be of any race.
Race / Ethnicity (NH = Non-Hispanic)	Pop 1980	Pop 1990	Pop 2000	Pop 2010	Pop 2020	% 1980	% 1990	% 2000	% 2010	% 2020
White alone (NH)	237,925	231,489	214,685	203,459	191,551	86.35%	82.11%	76.86%	72.43%	67.23%
Black or African American alone (NH)	21,004	27,315	29,712	31,931	34,446	7.62%	9.69%	10.64%	11.37%	12.09%
Native American or Alaska Native alone (NH)	1,523	1,767	1,349	1,239	953	0.55%	0.63%	0.48%	0.44%	0.33%
Asian alone (NH)	2,766	7,425	10,204	14,504	16,424	1.00%	2.63%	3.65%	5.16%	5.76%
Native Hawaiian or Pacific Islander alone (NH)	x	x	110	88	110	x	x	0.04%	0.03%	0.04%
Other race alone (NH)	1,743	438	481	424	1,451	0.63%	0.16%	0.17%	0.15%	0.51%
Mixed race or Multiracial (NH)	x	x	6,589	8,724	15,543	x	x	2.36%	3.11%	5.46%
Hispanic or Latino (any race)	10,559	13,478	16,190	20,526	24,422	3.83%	4.78%	5.80%	7.31%	8.57%
Total	275,520	281,912	279,320	280,895	284,900	100.00%	100.00%	100.00%	100.00%	100.00%

=== 2020 census ===
As of the 2020 census, the county had a population of 284,900 and a median age of 33.4 years. 19.9% of residents were under the age of 18 and 14.6% of residents were 65 years of age or older. For every 100 females there were 95.9 males, and for every 100 females age 18 and over there were 94.0 males age 18 and over.

The population density was 512.4 inhabitants per square mile (197.8/km^{2}), and there were 125,251 housing units at an average density of 225.3 per square mile (87.0/km^{2}).

The racial makeup of the county was 69.7% White, 12.5% Black or African American, 0.5% American Indian and Alaska Native, 5.8% Asian, <0.1% Native Hawaiian and Pacific Islander, 2.9% from some other race, and 8.5% from two or more races. Hispanic or Latino residents of any race comprised 8.6% of the population.

85.4% of residents lived in urban areas, while 14.6% lived in rural areas.

There were 115,591 households in the county, of which 25.7% had children under the age of 18 living in them. Of all households, 37.5% were married-couple households, 23.1% were households with a male householder and no spouse or partner present, and 31.4% were households with a female householder and no spouse or partner present. About 33.8% of all households were made up of individuals and 10.9% had someone living alone who was 65 years of age or older.

Of these units, 7.7% were vacant. Among occupied housing units, 57.9% were owner-occupied and 42.1% were renter-occupied. The homeowner vacancy rate was 1.6% and the rental vacancy rate was 8.2%.

According to the 2018–2023 American Community Survey 17.6% identified as having German ancestry, 12.0% English, 10.4% Irish, and 4.9% Polish ancestry. 86.6% spoke only English at home, while 4.0% Spanish, 3.5% another Indo-European language, and 3.4% spoke Asian languages.

=== 2010 census ===
As of the census of 2010, there were 280,895 people, 111,162 households, and 62,674 families residing in the county. The population density was 502.3 inhabitants per square mile (193.9/km^{2}). There were 121,281 housing units at an average density of 216.8 per square mile (83.7/km^{2}). The racial makeup of the county was 76.2% White, 11.8% Black or African American, 0.6% Native American, 5.2% Asian, 0.04% Pacific Islander, 2.3% from other races, and 4.0% from two or more races. 7.83% of the population were Hispanic or Latino of any race.

According to the 2007–2010 American Community Survey 22.8% were of German, 13.2% Irish, 12.5% English and 5.6% Polish ancestry. 88.2% spoke only English, while 3.9% spoke Asian languages and 3.8% Spanish at home.

=== 2000 census ===
As of the 2000 Census, there were 108,593 households, out of which 29.80% had children under the age of 18 living with them, 43.00% were married couples living together, 12.10% had a female householder with no husband present, and 41.30% were non-families. 30.20% of all households were made up of individuals, and 7.70% had someone living alone who was 65 years of age or older. The average household size was 2.42 and the average family size was 3.04.

In the county, 23.40% of the population was under the age of 18, 18.50% was from 18 to 24, 28.60% from 25 to 44, 20.10% from 45 to 64, and 9.40% who were 65 years of age or older. The median age was 30 years. For every 100 females, there were 93.30 males. For every 100 females age 18 and over, there were 90.10 males.

The median income for a household in the county was $40,774, and the median income for a family was $53,063. Males had a median income of $40,335 versus $30,178 for females. The per capita income for the county was $21,079. About 8.30% of families and 14.60% of the population were below the poverty line, including 14.60% of those under age 18 and 6.60% of those age 65 or over.

== Government ==
For most of the 20th century, Ingham County was rather conservative for an urban county. From 1900 to 1988, it voted Republican all but three times, in the national Democratic landslides of 1932, 1936 and 1964.

However, the Republican edge narrowed in the 1980s, and the county has gone Democratic at every election since 1992. In recent years, only Washtenaw County has been more Democratic.

United States presidential election results for Ingham County, Michigan
Year	Republican		Democratic		Third party(ies)	
Year	No.	%	No.	%	No.	%
1884	3,709	42.36%	4,562	52.11%	484	5.53%
1888	4,547	45.71%	4,782	48.07%	619	6.22%
1892	4,341	44.08%	4,061	41.23%	1,447	14.69%
1896	4,958	45.43%	5,691	52.14%	265	2.43%
1900	5,350	49.60%	5,104	47.32%	333	3.09%
1904	6,817	60.55%	3,871	34.38%	571	5.07%
1908	6,723	53.69%	5,016	40.06%	782	6.25%
1912	3,515	26.71%	3,915	29.75%	5,729	43.54%
1916	7,846	47.76%	7,664	46.65%	917	5.58%
1920	18,437	69.63%	7,061	26.67%	982	3.71%
1924	28,005	81.16%	4,814	13.95%	1,686	4.89%
1928	29,383	78.90%	7,654	20.55%	206	0.55%
1932	21,044	47.24%	22,370	50.22%	1,131	2.54%
1936	19,434	40.23%	27,086	56.06%	1,793	3.71%
1940	32,565	56.75%	24,375	42.48%	442	0.77%
1944	34,255	58.74%	23,655	40.57%	403	0.69%
1948	31,868	60.61%	19,366	36.83%	1,341	2.55%
1952	51,503	67.62%	24,125	31.68%	533	0.70%
1956	55,211	66.80%	27,323	33.06%	120	0.15%
1960	54,655	62.89%	32,043	36.87%	209	0.24%
1964	32,965	37.97%	53,685	61.83%	179	0.21%
1968	46,805	51.46%	37,362	41.08%	6,786	7.46%
1972	63,376	53.60%	53,458	45.21%	1,409	1.19%
1976	66,729	55.92%	47,890	40.13%	4,708	3.95%
1980	56,777	45.19%	48,278	38.43%	20,576	16.38%
1984	68,753	59.23%	46,411	39.98%	919	0.79%
1988	58,363	50.56%	55,984	48.50%	1,088	0.94%
1992	43,926	32.83%	61,596	46.04%	28,270	21.13%
1996	43,096	36.89%	63,584	54.43%	10,135	8.68%
2000	47,314	39.23%	69,231	57.41%	4,050	3.36%
2004	54,734	41.14%	76,877	57.78%	1,442	1.08%
2008	46,483	32.50%	93,994	65.72%	2,549	1.78%
2012	45,306	35.31%	80,847	63.01%	2,157	1.68%
2016	43,868	33.20%	79,110	59.87%	9,157	6.93%
2020	47,639	32.96%	94,212	65.18%	2,699	1.87%
2024	50,564	34.14%	94,542	63.84%	2,995	2.02%

United States Senate election results for Ingham County, Michigan1
Year	Republican		Democratic		Third party(ies)	
Year	No.	%	No.	%	No.	%
2024	48,083	32.75%	94,679	64.49%	4,054	2.76%

Michigan Gubernatorial election results for Ingham County
Year	Republican		Democratic		Third party(ies)	
Year	No.	%	No.	%	No.	%
2022	34,869	29.29%	82,408	69.23%	1,765	1.48%

The county government operates the jail, maintains rural roads, operates the major local courts, keeps files of deeds and mortgages, maintains vital records, administers public health regulations, and participates with the state in the provision of welfare and other social services. The 14-member county board of commissioners controls the budget, but has only limited authority to make laws or ordinances due to Michigan's large devolution of local power to cities, villages, and townships. The county board of commissioners also hires a county administrator/controller who serves as the chief fiscal and administrative officer of the county.

=== Elected officials ===
- Prosecuting Attorney: John Dewane (Note: Appointed December 31, 2022) (D)
- Sheriff: Scott Wriggelsworth (D)
- County Clerk: Barb Byrum (D)
- Register of Deeds: Derrick Quinney (D)
- County Treasurer: Alan Fox (Note: Appointed April 5, 2022) (D)
- Drain Commissioner: Patrick Lindemann (D)

=== County Board of Commissioners ===
15 members, elected from districts (12 Democrats, 3 Republicans)

District	Commissioner	Party
1	Randy Maiville, Vice Chair Pro Tem	Rep
2	Karla Ruest	Rep
3	Chris Trubac, Vice Chair	Dem
4	Todd Tennis	Dem
5	Myles Johnson	Dem
6	Rachel Willis	Dem
7	Thomas Morgan	Dem
8	Robert Peña	Dem
9	Ryan Sebolt, Chair	Dem
10	Gabrielle Lawrence	Dem
11	Mark Grebner	Dem
12	Irene Cahill	Dem
13	Tanya Pratt	Dem
14	Mark Polsdofer	Dem
15	Monica Schafer	Rep

=== 55th Judicial District Court ===
2 judges (non-partisan)

- Judge Richard Hillman
- Judge Nicole Matusko

=== 30th Judicial Circuit Court ===
9 judges (non-partisan)

- General Trial Division
  - Judge Joyce Draganchuk, Chief Circuit Judge
  - Judge Rosemarie Aquilina
  - Judge James Jamo
  - Judge Wanda Stokes
- Family Division
  - Judge Lisa McCormick, Presiding Judge
  - Judge Shauna Dunnings, Chief Circuit & Probate Judge Pro Tempore
  - Judge Richard Garcia, Judge of Probate
  - Judge Carol Koenig
  - Judge Morgan E. Cole

== Transportation ==
=== Air service ===
- Ingham County is served by Lansing Capital Region International Airport and Mason Jewett Field.

=== Rail service ===
- Amtrak
- Canadian National Railway
- CSX Transportation
- Jackson & Lansing Railroad

=== Bus service ===
- Capital Area Transportation Authority (CATA)
- Greyhound Lines
- Indian Trails

=== Highways ===
- I-96
- BL I-96
- I-496
- BL I-69
- US 127
- M-36
- M-43
- M-52
- M-99
- M-106
- M-143
- M-188

=== Recreational ===
- Lansing River Trail

== Communities ==
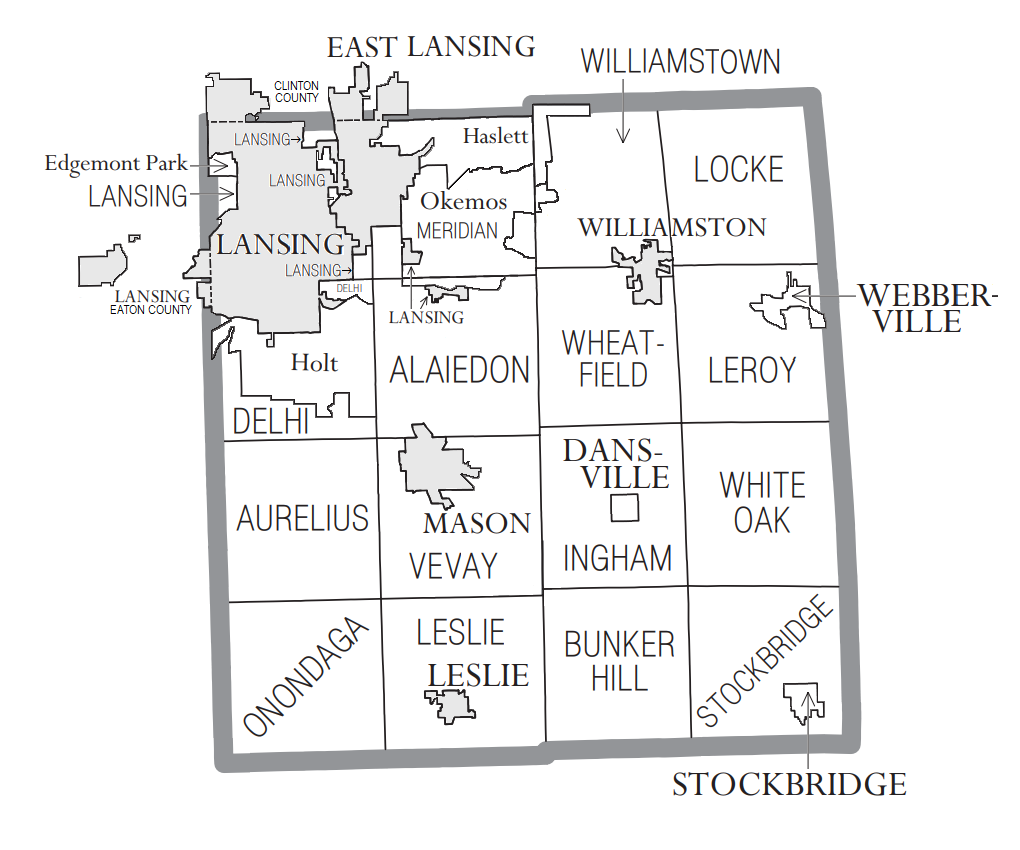
U.S. Census data map showing local municipal boundaries within Ingham County, as well as CDP boundaries. Shaded areas represent incorporated cities.

=== Cities ===
- East Lansing (part)
- Lansing (part)
- Leslie
- Mason (county seat)
- Williamston

=== Villages ===
- Dansville
- Stockbridge
- Webberville

=== Charter townships ===
- Delhi Charter Township
- Lansing Charter Township
- Meridian Charter Township

=== Civil townships ===
- Alaiedon Township
- Aurelius Township
- Bunker Hill Township
- Ingham Township
- Leroy Township
- Leslie Township
- Locke Township
- Onondaga Township
- Stockbridge Township
- Vevay Township
- Wheatfield Township
- White Oak Township
- Williamstown Township

=== Former townships ===
- Brutus Township, Michigan

=== Census-designated places ===
- Edgemont Park
- Haslett
- Holt
- Okemos

=== Other unincorporated communities ===
- Columbia
- Fitchburg
- Onondaga

== Education ==
School districts include:

- Dansville Schools
- East Lansing School District
- Eaton Rapids Public Schools
- Fowlerville Community Schools
- Haslett Public Schools
- Holt Public Schools
- Lansing Public School District
- Leslie Public Schools
- Mason Public Schools
- Morrice Area Schools
- Northwest School District
- Okemos Public Schools
- Perry Public School District
- Springport Public Schools
- Stockbridge Community Schools
- Waverly Community Schools
- Webberville Community Schools
- Williamston Community Schools

The Michigan School for the Blind, a state-operated school, was formerly in Lansing.

Michigan State University is in the county.

== See also ==
- List of Michigan State Historic Sites in Ingham County
- National Register of Historic Places listings in Ingham County, Michigan
