= Vevay Township, Michigan =

- Civil township
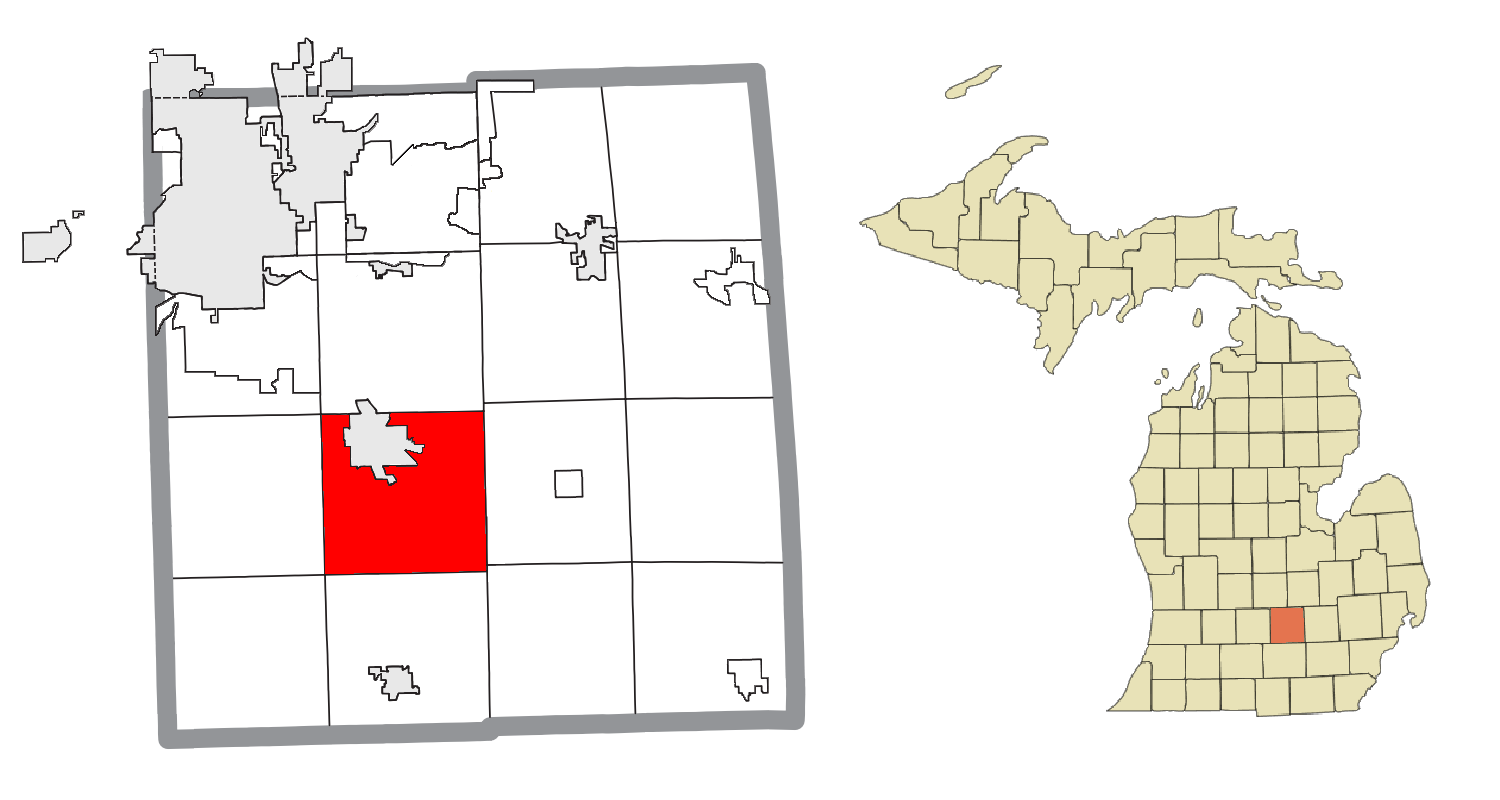
- Location within Ingham County

- Location within the state of Michigan Location within the United States
- Coordinates: 42°33′03″N 84°25′34″W
- Country: United States
- State: Michigan
- County: Ingham
- Settled: 1836
- Organized: 1838

Government
  - Supervisor: John Lazet
  - Clerk: JoAnne Kean

Area
  - Total: 31.64 sq mi (81.95 km^{2})
  - Land: 31.56 sq mi (81.74 km^{2})
  - Water: 0.081 sq mi (0.21 km^{2})
- Elevation: 906 ft (276 m)

Population (2020)
  - Total: 3,606
  - Density: 114.3/sq mi (44.12/km^{2})
- Time zone: UTC-5 (Eastern (EST))
  - Summer (DST): UTC-4 (EDT)
- ZIP code(s): 48854 (Mason); 49251 (Leslie)
- Area code: 517
- FIPS code: 26-82220
- GNIS feature ID: 1627198
- Website: Official website

Vevay Township is a civil township of Ingham County in the U.S. state of Michigan. The population was 3,606 at the 2020 census. The township is part of the Lansing–East Lansing metropolitan area and mostly surrounds the city of Mason, but the two are administered autonomously.

== History ==
The area was first surveyed as early as 1824, and the current eastern boundary of the township is along the Michigan meridian. The township was first settled in 1836 by the Rolfe family. The Michigan legislature approved the creation of Vevay Township from a portion of Aurelius Township on March 6, 1838. The township received its name from Vevay, Indiana. The village of Mason was part of Vevay Township until it incorporated as a city in 1875. Since then, the city has annexed portions of Vevay Township.

The Jackson, Lansing and Saginaw Railroad ran a railway line through the township beginning in 1844 and had two station along the route—one as Mason Centre and another at Eden. The Eden post office opened in 1843 and operated until it was discontinued in 1971. The first township hall was a wood structure built as early as 1890. The current township hall was opened in 1978.

== Communities ==
- Columbia is a former settlement first settled in 1837.
- Eden is an unincorporated community in the township. It was first settled in 1843.

== Geography ==
According to the United States Census Bureau, the township has a total area of 31.64 square miles (81.95 km^{2}), of which 31.56 square miles (81.74 km^{2}) is land and 0.08 square miles (0.21 km^{2}) (0.25%) is water.

Sycamore Creek flows northward through the township.

== Demographics ==
As of the census of 2000, there were 3,614 people, 1,264 households, and 1,054 families residing in the township. The population density was 112.3 inhabitants per square mile (43.4/km^{2}). There were 1,309 housing units at an average density of 40.7 per square mile (15.7/km^{2}). The racial makeup of the township was 96.51% White, 0.77% African American, 0.30% Native American, 0.33% Asian, 1.02% from other races, and 1.05% from two or more races. Hispanic or Latino of any race were 2.02% of the population.

There were 1,264 households, out of which 40.4% had children under the age of 18 living with them, 71.5% were married couples living together, 7.2% had a female householder with no husband present, and 16.6% were non-families. 12.8% of all households were made up of individuals, and 4.5% had someone living alone who was 65 years of age or older. The average household size was 2.86 and the average family size was 3.10.

In the township the population was spread out, with 27.3% under the age of 18, 7.4% from 18 to 24, 28.1% from 25 to 44, 28.4% from 45 to 64, and 8.7% who were 65 years of age or older. The median age was 38 years. For every 100 females, there were 101.1 males. For every 100 females age 18 and over, there were 99.8 males.

The median income for a household in the township was $56,324, and the median income for a family was $62,725. Males had a median income of $41,250 versus $31,071 for females. The per capita income for the township was $21,488. About 2.3% of families and 2.3% of the population were below the poverty line, including 3.5% of those under age 18 and none of those age 65 or over.
