= Red Cedar River (Michigan) =

River in Michigan, United States

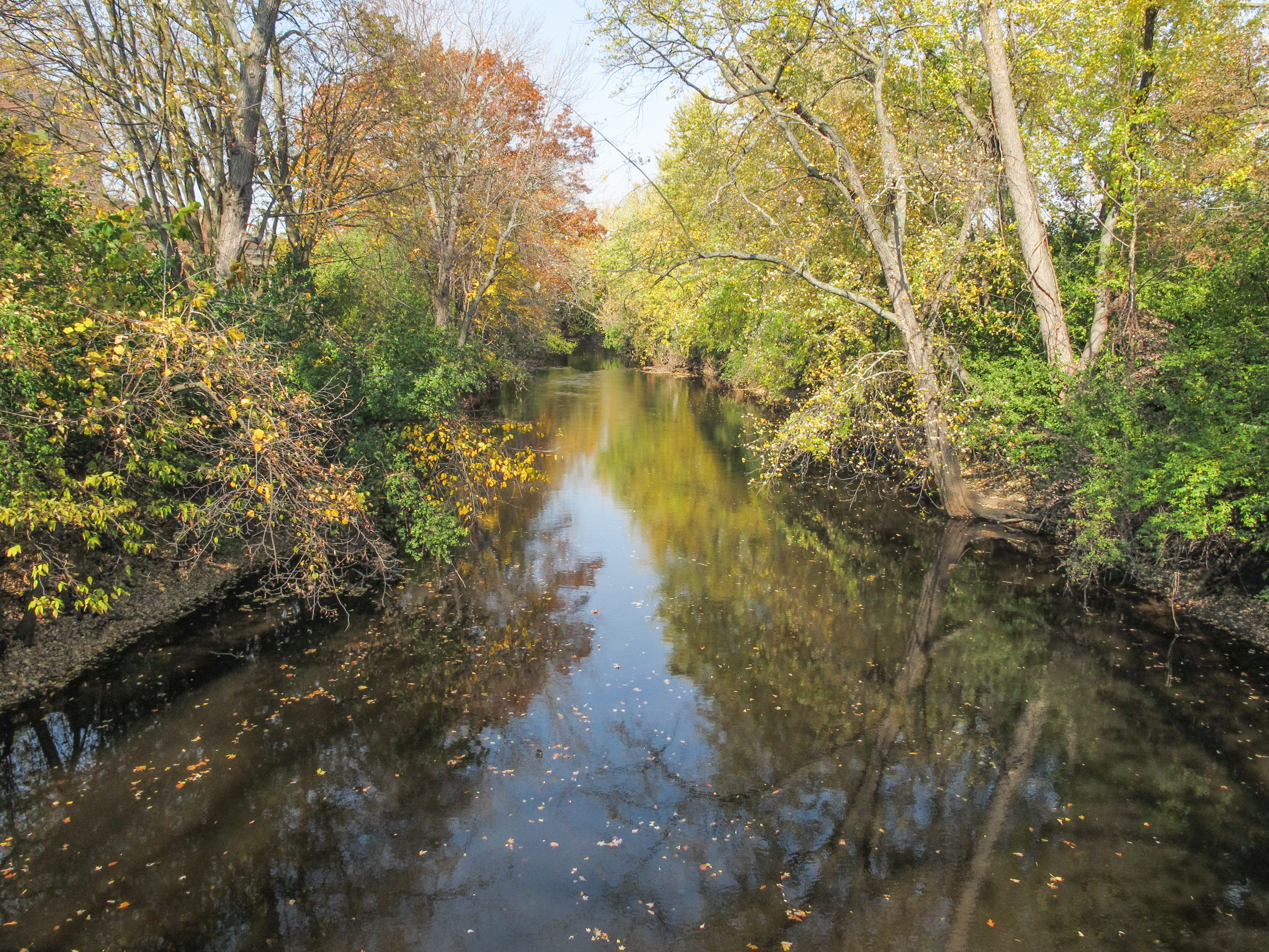
- The Red Cedar River on the campus of Michigan State University in autumn

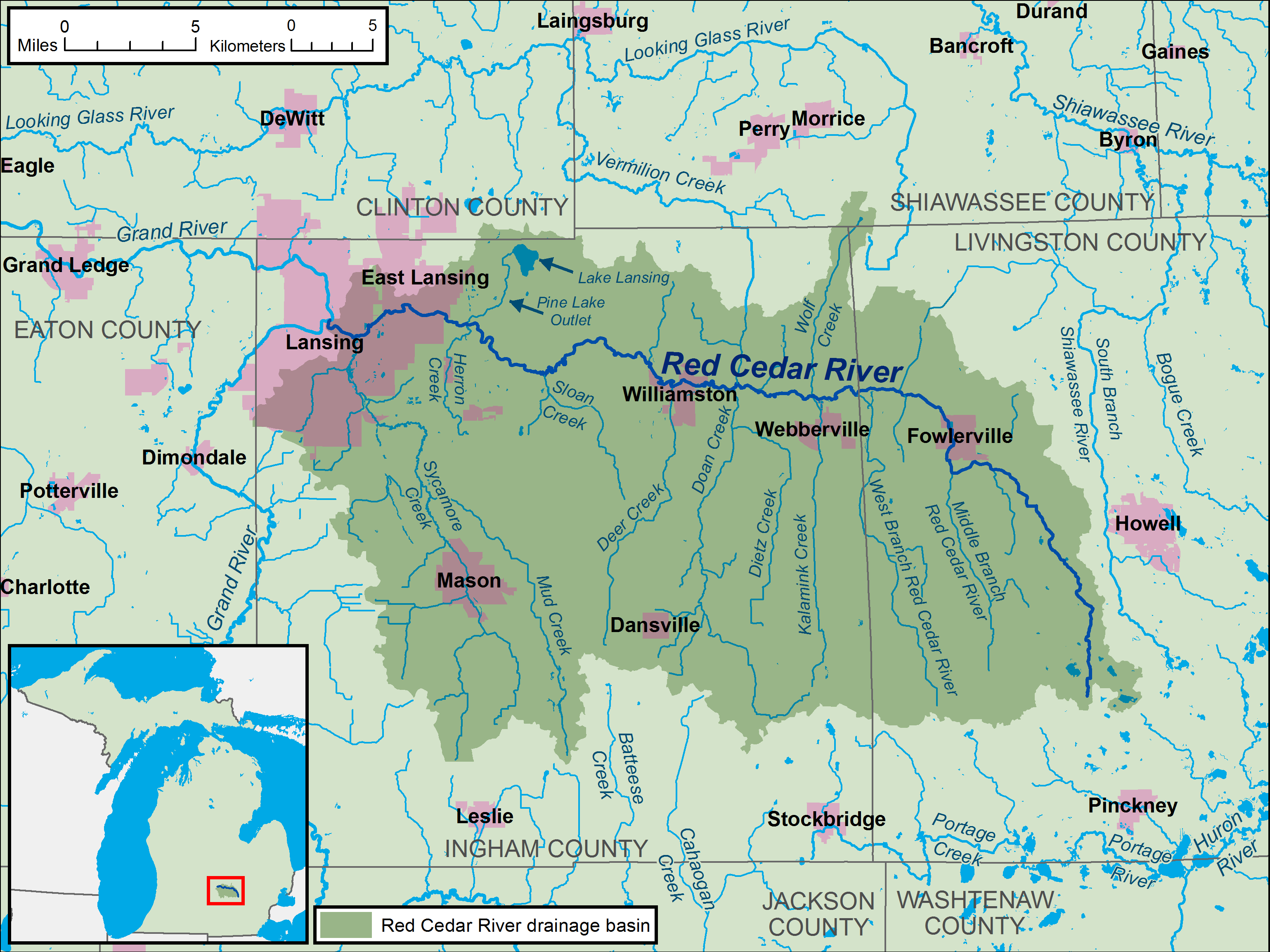
- A map of the Red Cedar River and its watershed

Location
- Country: United States
- State: Michigan
- Counties: Ingham, Livingston
- Cities: Fowlerville, Williamston, Okemos, East Lansing, Lansing

Physical characteristics
- Source: Cedar Lake
  - location: Livingston County, Michigan, United States
  - coordinates: 42°31′03″N 83°58′42″W
- Mouth: Grand River
  - location: Lansing, Michigan, United States
  - coordinates: 42°43′29″N 84°32′53″W
- Length: 51 mi (82 km)
- Basin size: 461 sq mi (1,190 km^{2})
- Discharge
  - location: mouth
  - average: 332.88 cu ft/s (9.426 m^{3}/s) (estimate)

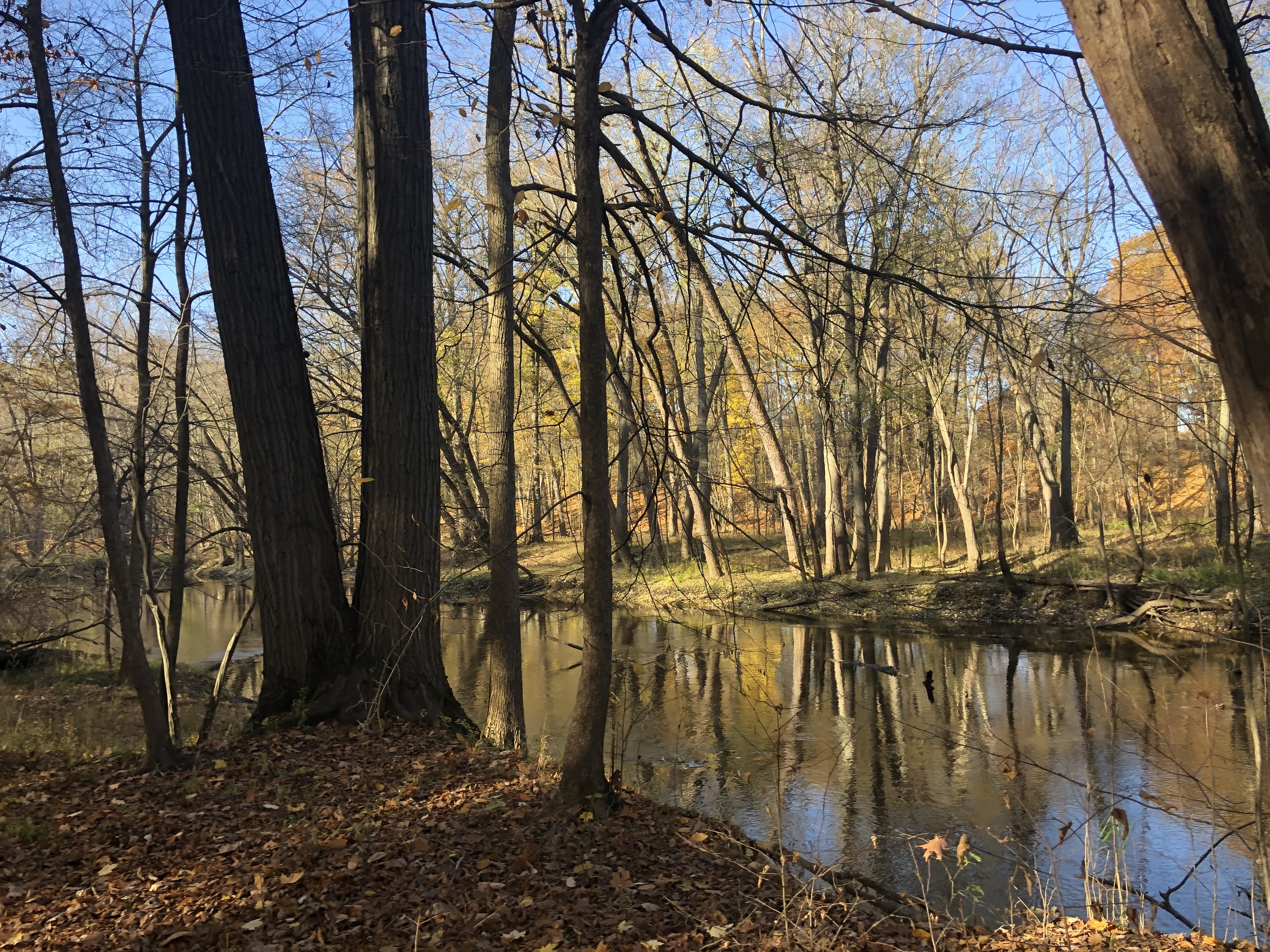
Red Cedar River in Okemos.

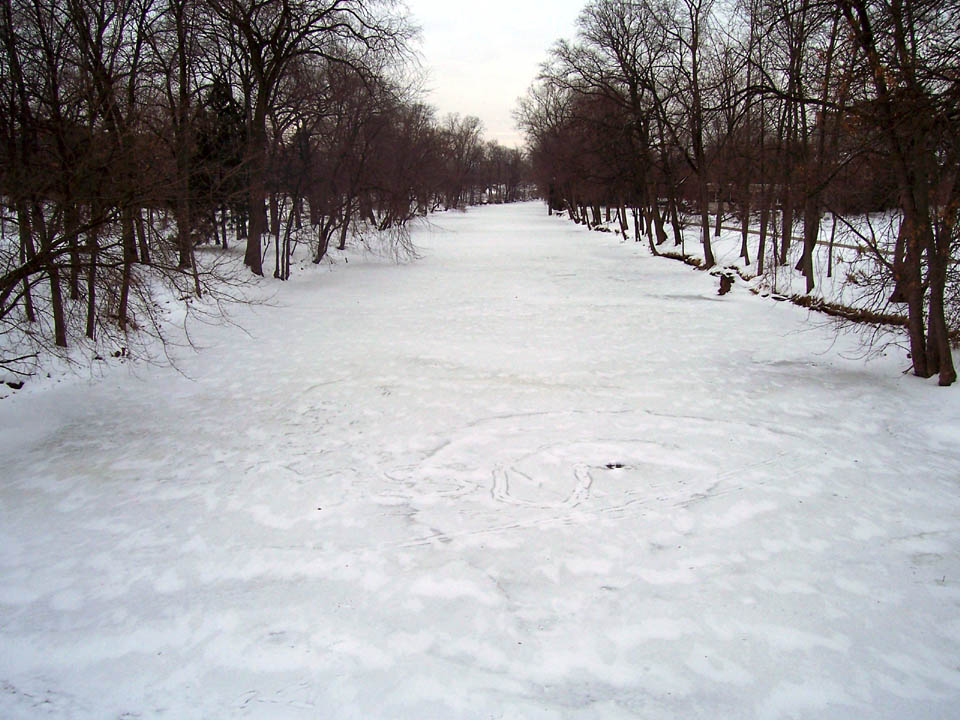
The river in winter.

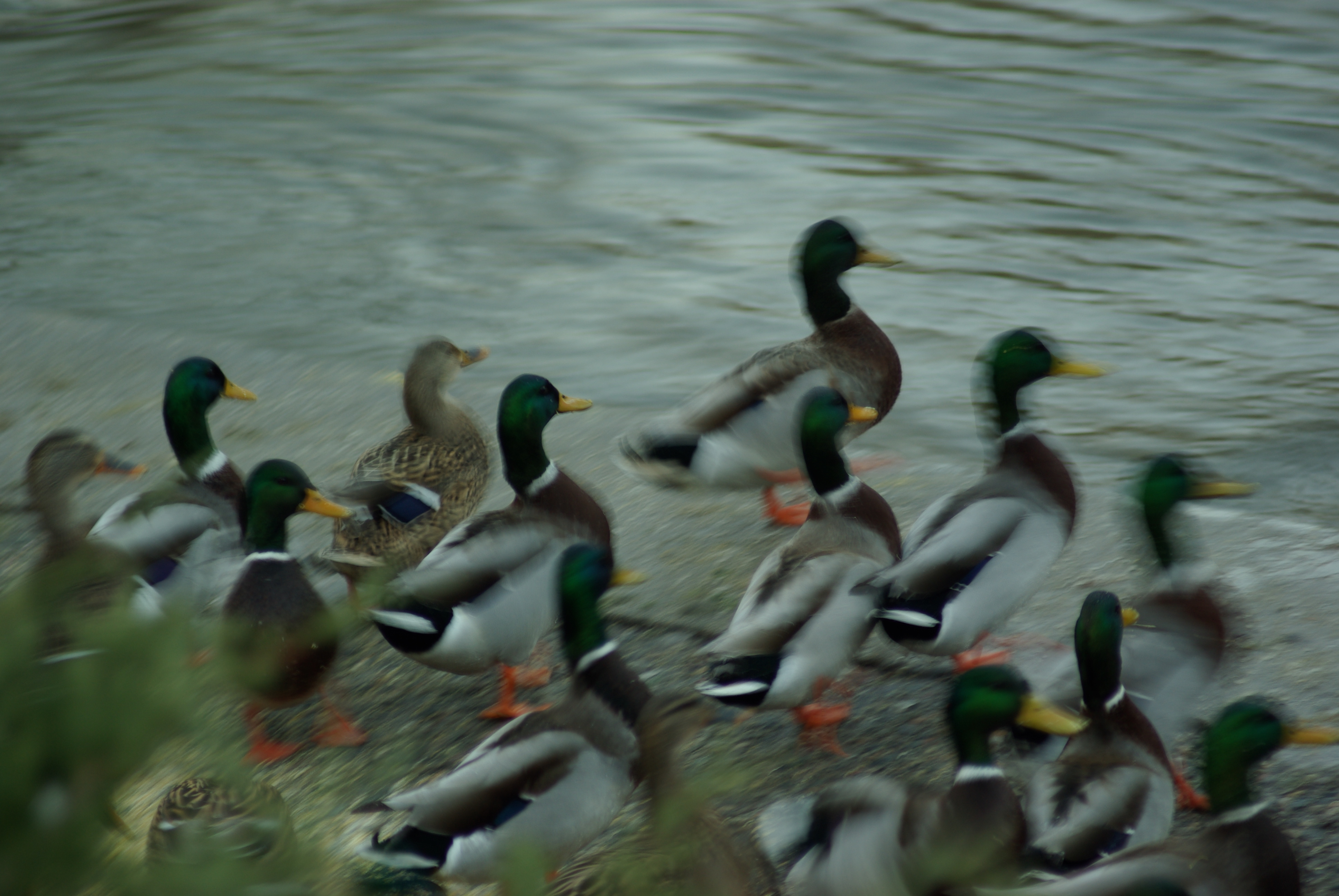
Mallards entering the river on the campus of MSU.

The Red Cedar River is a 51.1-mile-long (82.2 km) river in the U.S. state of Michigan. The river, which is a tributary of the Grand River in Michigan's Lower Peninsula, drains a watershed of approximately 461 square miles (1,190 km^{2}) in the Lansing–East Lansing metropolitan area and suburban and rural areas to the east. The river flows through the campus of Michigan State University, and is considered a cultural symbol of the school, including being mentioned in the school's fight song.

== Name ==
The river was presumably named for the juniper species Juniperus virginiana, commonly known as red cedar, a plant native to the region. Prior to a 1966 decision by the U.S. Board on Geographic Names, the river was shown as Cedar River on federal maps, despite being known as the Red Cedar River locally. The board's review was prompted by a 1962 letter from Milton P. Adams, then-secretary of the Michigan Water Resources Commission, who noted in his letter that "generations of M.S.U. students have solemnly and with hearts full sung the glories of their Alma Mater 'on the banks of the Red Cedar.' Countless great careers have been launched, lifelong romances have budded, and strong characters have been wrought in these environs, presumably on the banks of the 'Red' Cedar.

== Course ==
The river's source is Cedar Lake in Marion Township in southern Livingston County. It flows for 51.1 miles (82.2 km), first northwestward through Fowlerville, then westward through northern Ingham County. In Ingham County it flows through Williamston, Okemos, East Lansing, and finally Lansing, where it empties into the Grand River. In East Lansing the river passes through the campus of Michigan State University.

The river is not navigable by boats larger than recreational size.

== Watershed ==
The river's watershed is approximately 462 square miles (1,200 km^{2}) in size. Among the river's larger tributaries, ordered from its mouth to its source, are Sycamore Creek, Pine Lake Outlet (the outflow of Lake Lansing), Sloan Creek, Deer Creek, Doan Creek, Kalamink Creek, the West Branch Red Cedar River, and the Middle Branch Red Cedar River. The Red Cedar River Watershed (RCRW) contains a diverse mix of rural lands dominated by agricultural land use and small communities, suburban areas, and highly urbanized lands. The watershed is home to thousands of residents who live, learn, work, and recreate within its lands and waters. Farms, factories, and shopping malls are necessary for quality of life. Equally important are clean water for fishing, swimming, and drinking, and natural landscapes for aesthetic relief. The river and its watershed are also home for a myriad of plants and animals that rely on a clean, protected environment to flourish.

== Water quality ==
Since the national Clean Water Act in 1972, the river has greatly improved and is safe for swimming 74% of the year (the exception usually being right after heavy rains which bring higher levels of E. coli from runoff waters). The Red Cedar is regularly monitored by MSU Water with the contaminant reports posted by the Michigan State University International Center. Despite these improvements, littering and pollution into the river and onto its banks is a common problem and includes bikes, parking barricades, general trash, and occasionally large items such as car tires and mopeds. To combat this problem, twice per year the undergraduate MSU Fisheries and Wildlife club holds a "Red Cedar Clean-Up" event that brings students, faculty, alumni, and community members together to remove and recycle items found in the river and its banks.

== Michigan State University campus ==
The Red Cedar River is a familiar campus landmark at Michigan State University. The name of the river is featured in the first line of MSU's fight song, and MSU students can be found studying in the parkland along its banks. A number of student activities centered around the Red Cedar over the course of MSU's history, including freshman vs. sophomore "tug-o-war" spanning the river and a Water Carnival featuring student made floats drifting in procession. People on campus frequently feed the large community of mallard ducks that congregate near the river.

Alongside the river on MSU's campus is the W.J. Beal Botanical Garden, the oldest continuous botanical garden in the United States. The garden was started in 1873.

The river is popular in the summer for canoeing and kayaking. (The campus canoe dock is self-mockingly named Red Cedar Yacht Club.) During floods, the river forms a standing wave at the campus dam that can be surfed. In the winter, the river often freezes over and students walk or play on the ice despite the inherent danger. During its inaugural season in 1922, the MSU hockey team played games on the frozen river.

Fishing was banned on the campus in the 1960s; the ban was rescinded for a section of the river in 2013. Wildlife in the river includes 33 species of fish and various other aquatic animals, and study of the river and its ecosystem is incorporated into relevant areas of the university's curricula. From December 1979 to 1981, Dr. Patrick M. Muzzall from MSU's zoology department collected the following species: white sucker, northern hog sucker, spotted sucker, golden redhorse, silver redhorse, rock bass, green sunfish, pumpkin seed, warmouth, bluegill, smallmouth bass, largemouth bass, black crappie, stoneroller, carp, hornyhead chub, common shiner, rosyface shiner, sand shiner, bluntnose minnow, western blacknose dace, creek chub, grass pickerel, brook stickleback, black bullhead, yellow bullhead, brown bullhead, rainbow darter, johnny darter, yellow perch, blackside darter, and central mudminnow.

== See also ==
- List of rivers of Michigan
