= Wheatfield Township, Michigan =

- Civil township
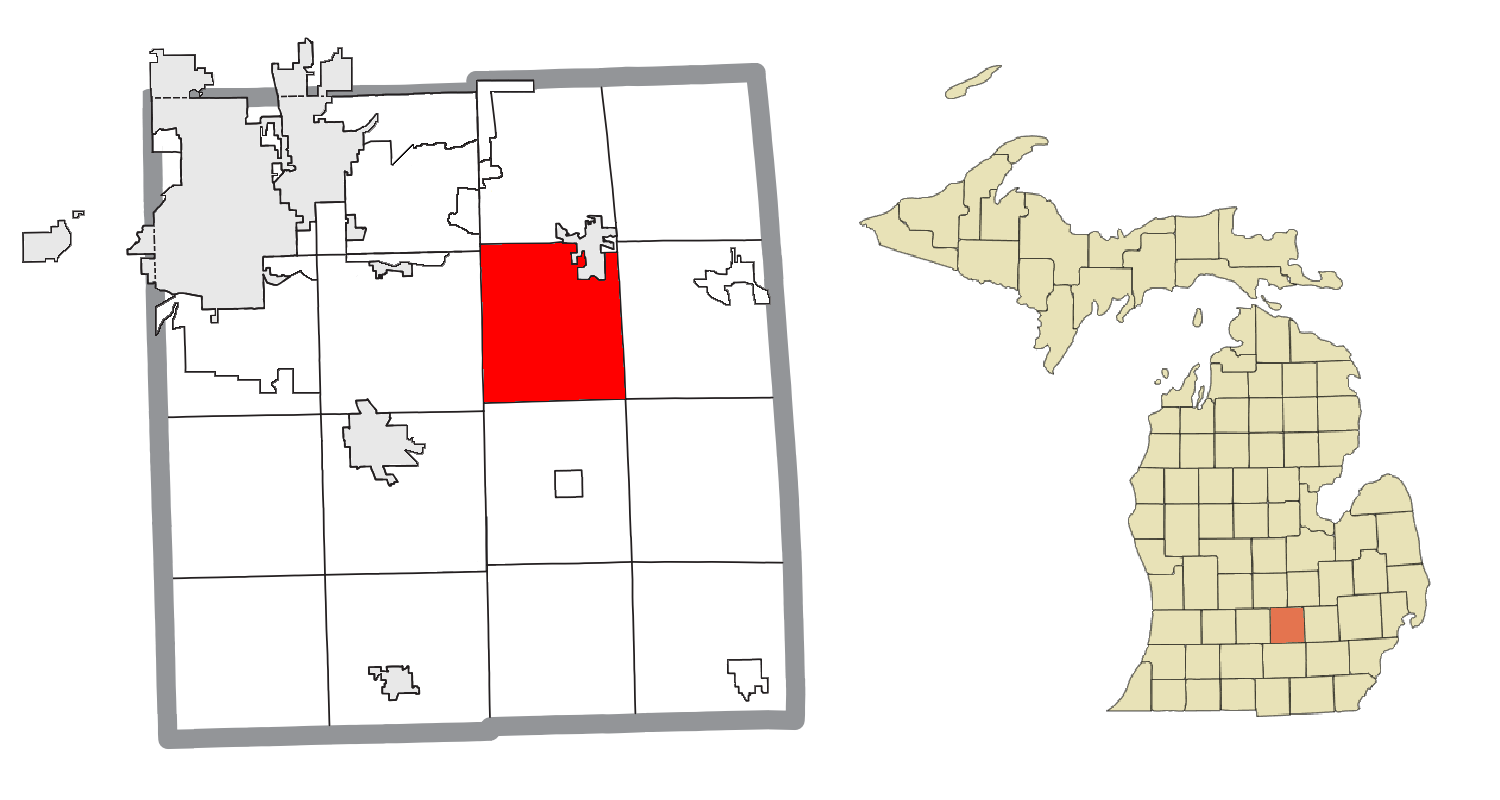
- Location within Ingham County

- Location within the state of Michigan Location within the United States
- Coordinates: 42°38′45″N 84°18′44″W
- Country: United States
- State: Michigan
- County: Ingham
- Organized: 1841

Government
  - Supervisor: Wayne Myer
  - Clerk: Denise Kapp

Area
  - Total: 29.20 sq mi (75.63 km^{2})
  - Land: 29.24 sq mi (75.74 km^{2})
  - Water: 0.062 sq mi (0.16 km^{2})
- Elevation: 909 ft (277 m)

Population (2020)
  - Total: 1,665
  - Density: 56.94/sq mi (21.98/km^{2})
- Time zone: UTC-5 (Eastern (EST))
  - Summer (DST): UTC-4 (EDT)
- ZIP code(s): 48854 (Mason); 48864 (Okemos); 48895 (Williamston)
- Area code: 517
- FIPS code: 26-86520
- GNIS feature ID: 1627254
- Website: https://wheatfieldtwpmi.gov/

Wheatfield Township is a civil township of Ingham County in the U.S. state of Michigan. The population was 1,665 at the 2020 census.

== History ==
Wheatfield Township was organized in 1841.

== Geography ==
According to the United States Census Bureau, the township has a total area of 29.20 square miles (75.63 km^{2}), of which 29.14 square miles (75.47 km^{2}) is land and 0.06 square miles (0.16 km^{2}) (0.21%) is water.

Interstate 96 runs east–west through the northern portion of the township with one access point at exit 117 (Williamston Road) at the southern border with the city of Williamston.

== Demographics ==
As of the census of 2000, there were 1,641 people, 570 households, and 466 families residing in the township. The population density was 56.4 inhabitants per square mile (21.8/km^{2}). There were 588 housing units at an average density of 20.2 per square mile (7.8/km^{2}). The racial makeup of the township was 97.26% White, 0.49% African American, 0.06% Native American, 0.98% Asian, 0.30% from other races, and 0.91% from two or more races. Hispanic or Latino of any race were 1.40% of the population.

There were 570 households, out of which 40.5% had children under the age of 18 living with them, 74.6% were married couples living together, 3.7% had a female householder with no husband present, and 18.2% were non-families. 13.9% of all households were made up of individuals, and 4.7% had someone living alone who was 65 years of age or older. The average household size was 2.88 and the average family size was 3.19.

In the township the population was spread out, with 28.6% under the age of 18, 5.9% from 18 to 24, 28.3% from 25 to 44, 28.3% from 45 to 64, and 9.0% who were 65 years of age or older. The median age was 38 years. For every 100 females, there were 98.9 males. For every 100 females age 18 and over, there were 99.7 males.

The median income for a household in the township was $63,636, and the median income for a family was $70,078. Males had a median income of $47,679 versus $32,625 for females. The per capita income for the township was $26,540. About 1.0% of families and 2.1% of the population were below the poverty line, including 1.0% of those under age 18 and none of those age 65 or over.
