= Dansville, Michigan =

- Village
- Village of Dansville
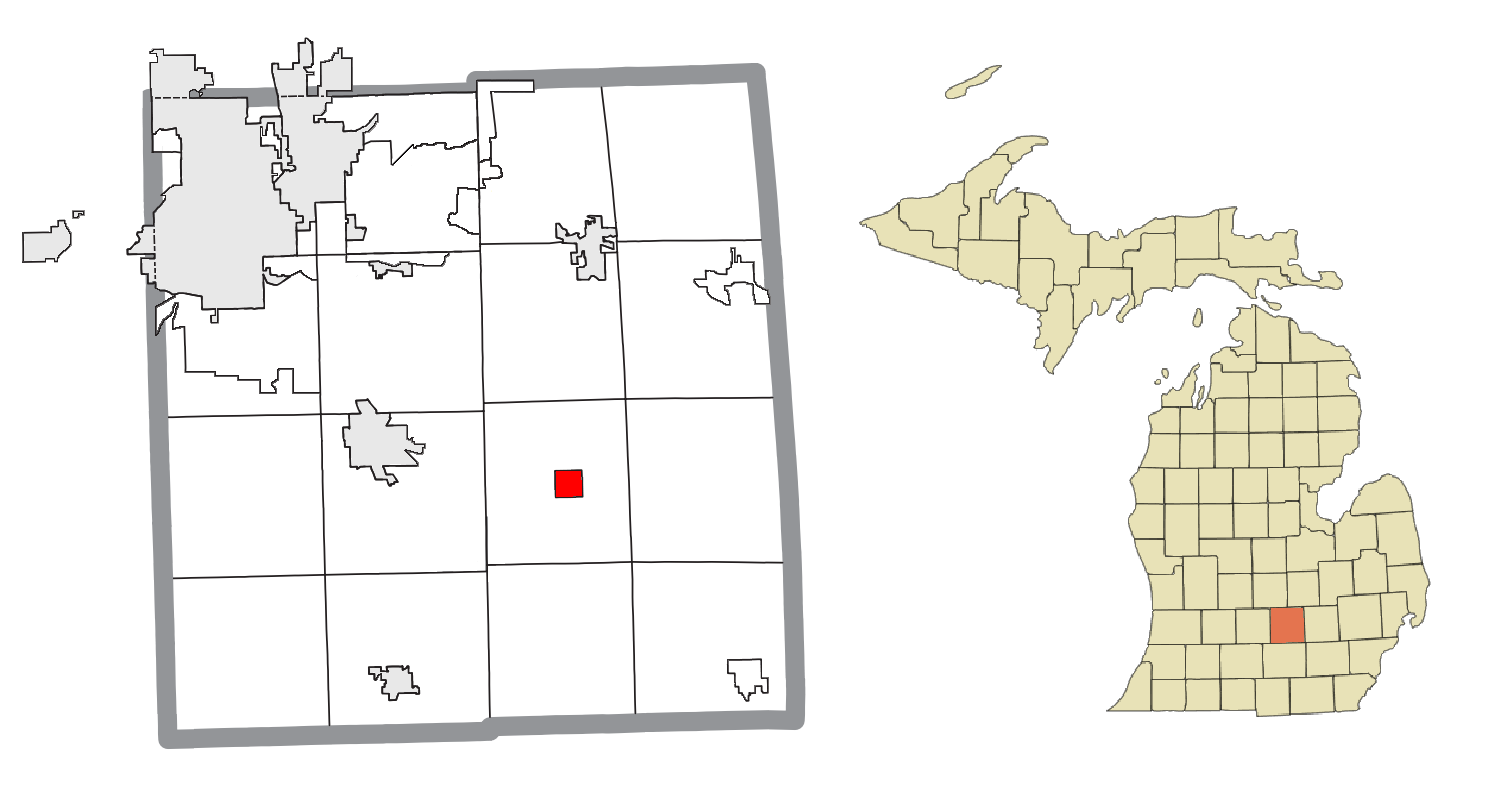
- Location within Ingham County

- Location within the state of Michigan Location within the United States
- Coordinates: 42°33′21″N 84°18′11″W
- Country: United States
- State: Michigan
- County: Ingham
- Township: Ingham
- Settled: 1844
- Incorporated: 1867

Government
  - Type: Village council
  - Treasurer: Jennifer Ashton

Area
  - Total: 1.01 sq mi (2.61 km^{2})
  - Land: 1.00 sq mi (2.60 km^{2})
  - Water: 0 sq mi (0.00 km^{2})
- Elevation: 968 ft (295 m)

Population (2020)
  - Total: 529
  - Density: 526.1/sq mi (203.13/km^{2})
- Time zone: UTC-5 (Eastern (EST))
  - Summer (DST): UTC-4 (EDT)
- ZIP code(s): 48819
- Area code: 517
- FIPS code: 26-19780
- GNIS feature ID: 2398680
- Website: www.villageofdansvillemi.org

Dansville is a village in Ingham County in the U.S. state of Michigan. It is centered along M-36 within Ingham Township about 22 miles (35 km) southeast of downtown Lansing. The population was 529 at the 2020 census.

== History ==
As far as European settlement is concerned, the area that is now the village of Dansville was originally settled by Samuel Crossman in 1844, who, like many settlers at the time, had come from the state of New York in search of a new life. Samuel Crossman's son, Daniel Crossman, officially platted the village in 1857, naming it after himself and the village's first postmaster, Dr. Daniel T. Weston. The settlement was not actually incorporated as a village until 1867.

Dansville is one of the earliest settlements in Ingham County. Permanent home-seekers located there as early as 1836–40, and the first business establishment was a small store, with a general stock, opened by Samuel Crossman about 1847. The first hotel was the Union Hotel, built in 1856-7 by David D. Fox. A post office was established in the southern part of Ingham Township in 1846, and was first kept by John B. Lobdell. Later it was moved to Hayne’s Corners, one and one-half mile south of the present village, and Henry Densmore was postmaster. It finally came to Dansville, where Daniel T. Weston was the first postmaster in 1855. The original plat of the village was laid out May BG, 1857, by Samuel Crossman and Ephraim Hillaird. D. L. Crossman and Dakin and Otis made additions in 1866.

Today, Dansville is a small village with much of its economy based on agriculture. While the village is in proximity to the state capital and Michigan State University, it has seen little commercial development over its history. The small town's economy is supported primarily by small business, agriculture research, and production.

== Geography ==
According to the United States Census Bureau, the village has a total area of 1.01 square miles (2.62 km^{2}), all land.

== Demographics ==
Historical population
Census	Pop.	Note	%±
1870	443		—
1880	440		−0.7%
1890	366		−16.8%
1900	374		2.2%
1910	349		−6.7%
1920	299		−14.3%
1930	315		5.4%
1940	351		11.4%
1950	433		23.4%
1960	453		4.6%
1970	486		7.3%
1980	479		−1.4%
1990	437		−8.8%
2000	429		−1.8%
2010	563		31.2%
2020	529		−6.0%
U.S. Decennial Census

=== 2010 census ===
As of the census of 2010, there were 563 people, 193 households, and 154 families living in the village. The population density was 563.0 inhabitants per square mile (217.4/km^{2}). There were 206 housing units at an average density of 206.0 per square mile (79.5/km^{2}). The racial makeup of the village was 95.6% White, 0.7% African American, 1.1% Native American, 0.7% Asian, 0.4% from other races, and 1.6% from two or more races. Hispanic or Latino of any race were 1.6% of the population.

There were 193 households, of which 48.2% had children under the age of 18 living with them, 55.4% were married couples living together, 20.7% had a female householder with no husband present, 3.6% had a male householder with no wife present, and 20.2% were non-families. 15.0% of all households were made up of individuals, and 4.6% had someone living alone who was 65 years of age or older. The average household size was 2.92 and the average family size was 3.16.

The median age in the village was 33.4 years. 31.8% of residents were under the age of 18; 8.3% were between the ages of 18 and 24; 28.6% were from 25 to 44; 23.3% were from 45 to 64; and 8.2% were 65 years of age or older. The gender makeup of the village was 49.2% male and 50.8% female.

=== 2000 census ===
As of the census of 2000, there were 429 people, 142 households, and 111 families living in the village. The population density was 429.0 inhabitants per square mile (165.6/km^{2}). There were 148 housing units at an average density of 148.0 per square mile (57.1/km^{2}). The racial makeup of the village was 95.80% White, 0.23% African American, 0.93% Native American, 0.70% Asian, 1.63% from other races, and 0.70% from two or more races. Hispanic or Latino of any race were 3.26% of the population.

There were 142 households, out of which 47.9% had children under the age of 18 living with them, 61.3% were married couples living together, 12.7% had a female householder with no husband present, and 21.8% were non-families. 17.6% of all households were made up of individuals, and 4.9% had someone living alone who was 65 years of age or older. The average household size was 2.98 and the average family size was 3.40.

In the village, the population was spread out, with 30.8% under the age of 18, 8.6% from 18 to 24, 35.7% from 25 to 44, 18.9% from 45 to 64, and 6.1% who were 65 years of age or older. The median age was 32 years. For every 100 females, there were 91.5 males. For every 100 females age 18 and over, there were 94.1 males.

The median income for a household in the village was $48,214, and the median income for a family was $51,964. Males had a median income of $36,528 versus $25,500 for females. The per capita income for the village was $16,951. About 4.3% of families and 4.3% of the population were below the poverty line, including 5.0% of those under age 18 and 17.9% of those age 65 or over.

== Octagon House ==
Visible throughout the village is the Dr. D. J. Weston Octagon House. This drew extensive media attention as a base for state aid during droughts of 1986. Military personnel rationed and supplied additional water supplies when required during the summer months, with these images often entering state news broadcasts at the time.

== Notable people ==
- Lindsay Bowen (b. 1983), basketball player
- Francine Hughes (1947–2017), battered wife who killed her husband Mickey in self defense after 13 years of horrific domestic violence. She was the inspiration of the book The Burning Bed, which took place in Dansville
- Sam Williams (1931–2013), American football player
