= Teaspoon Hill =

Hill in Leslie, Michigan, United States

Teaspoon Hill is a geographical feature in Leslie, Michigan. Its peak reaches an elevation of 1053 feet (321 meters). It was named after the nearby site of a tavern and inn just west of it called Teaspoon corners later North Leslie in 1874.
