= Mason, Michigan =

- City
- City of Mason
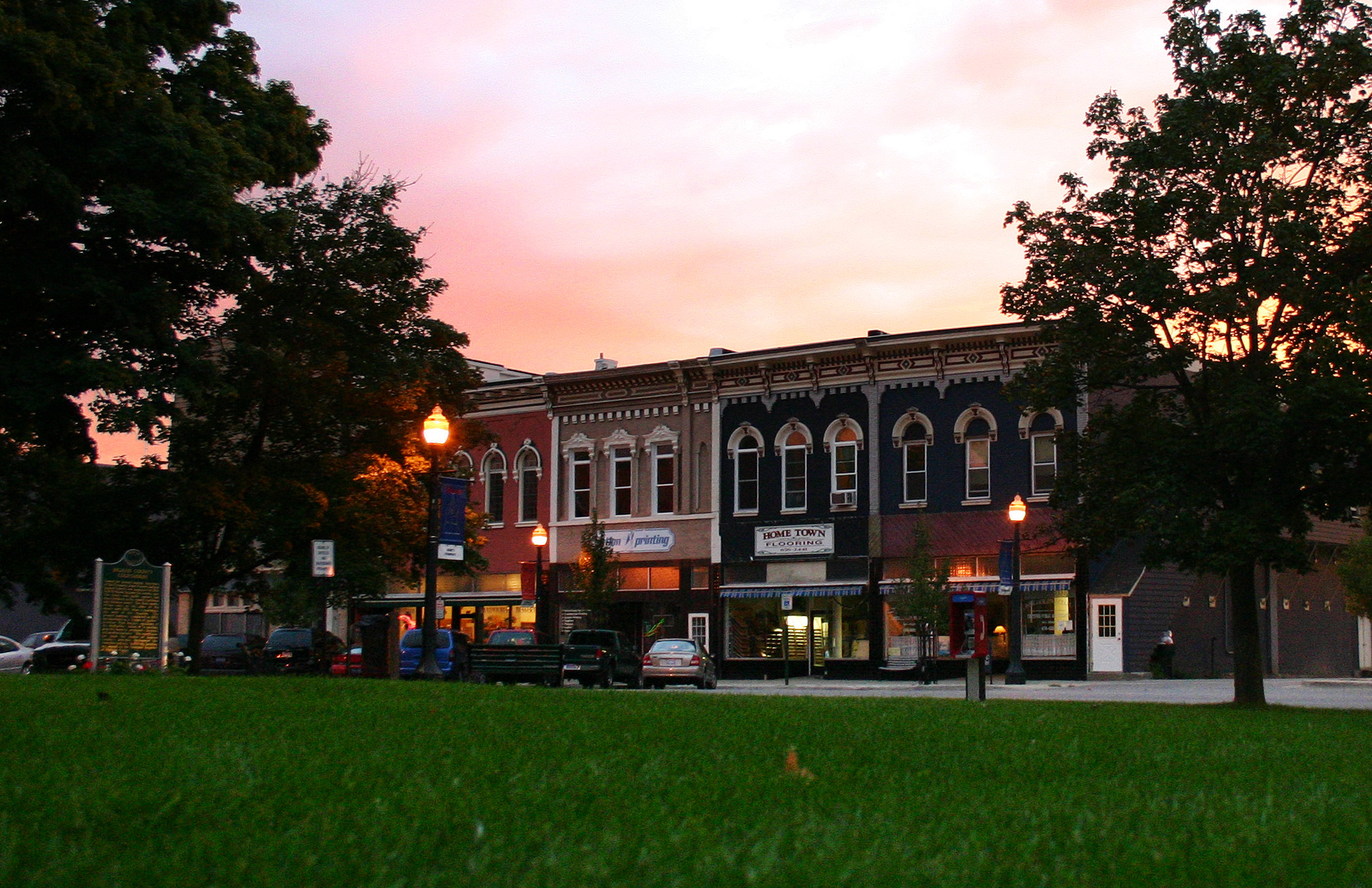
- Downtown Mason from Town Square

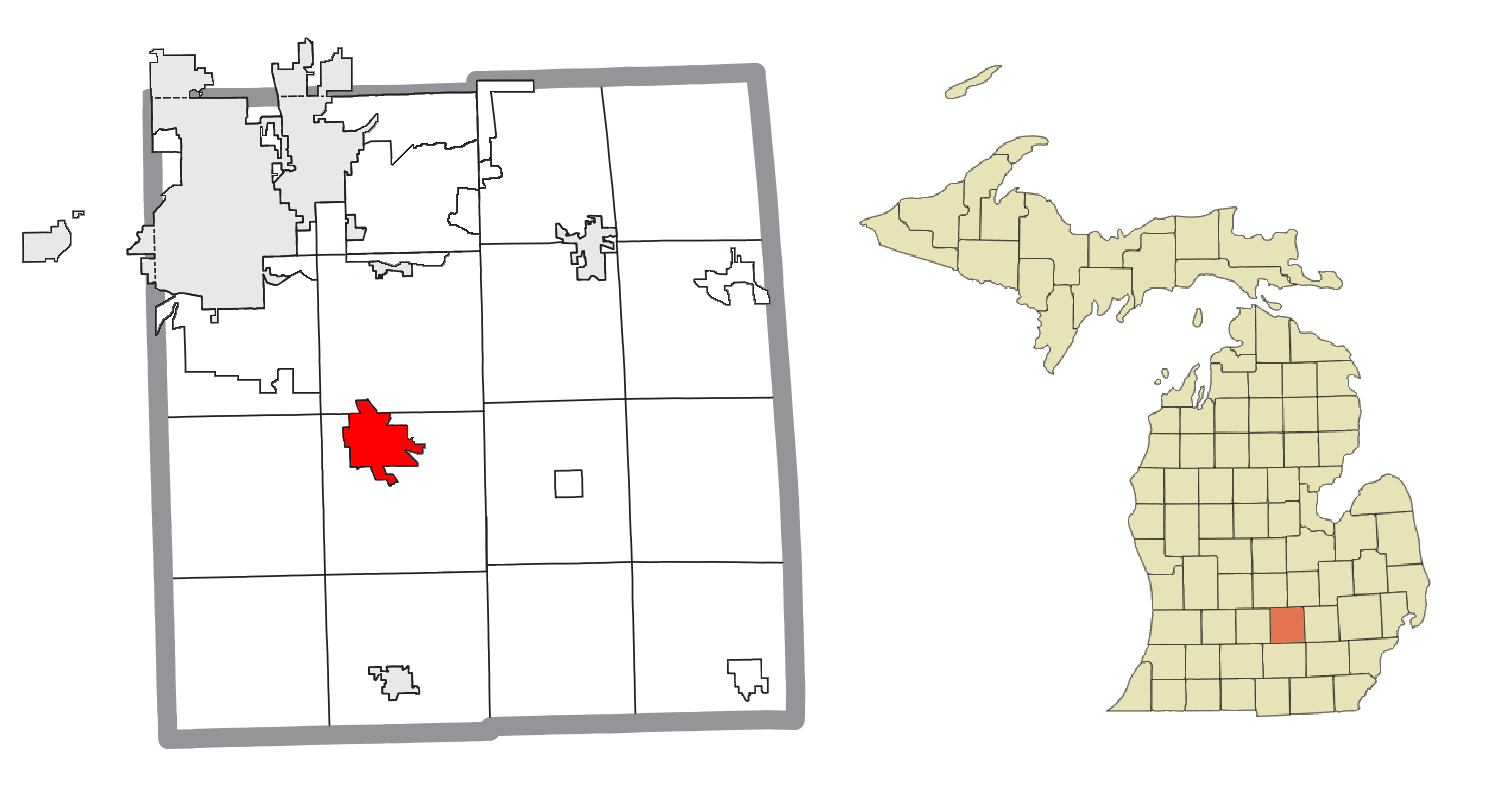
- Location within Ingham County

- Location within the state of Michigan Location within the United States
- Coordinates: 42°34′50″N 84°26′34″W
- Country: United States
- State: Michigan
- County: Ingham
- Settled: 1836
- Incorporated: 1865 (village); 1875 (city)

Government
  - Type: Council–manager
  - Mayor: Russell W. Whipple
  - Manager: Deborah Stuart
  - Clerk: Sarah Jarvis

Area
  - Total: 5.13 sq mi (13.29 km^{2})
  - Land: 5.11 sq mi (13.24 km^{2})
  - Water: 0.019 sq mi (0.05 km^{2})
- Elevation: 915 ft (279 m)

Population (2020)
  - Total: 8,283
  - Density: 1,620.8/sq mi (625.81/km^{2})
- Time zone: UTC-5 (EST)
  - Summer (DST): UTC-4 (EDT)
- ZIP code(s): 48854
- Area code: 517
- FIPS code: 26-52180
- GNIS feature ID: 1626706
- Website: Official website

Mason is a city in and the county seat of Ingham County in the U.S. state of Michigan. The population was 8,283 at the 2020 census. Mason was named after Stevens T. Mason, the state's first governor.

== History ==
In 1836 Charles Noble knew that Michigan would be seeking a central location for a new capital when it became a state. He purchased an area of forest, cleared 20 acres (81,000 m2), and founded Mason Center. The "Center" was soon dropped. In 1847, however, the state chose Lansing Township 12 miles (19 km) northward to be its capital due to its potential for water power. Noble managed to make Mason the county seat instead. Ingham County's first downtown courthouse was built in 1843, and was replaced in 1858, and the economy thrived in the first decades based on sawmills, carriage and cart factories, copper shops, a steam flourmill and a buffalo robe manufacturer. In 1865, Mason was incorporated as a village; in 1875 the town became a city. In the 1800s, Mason was the center of Ingham County activity, even more than was Lansing, the state capital. In 1877, Lansing attempted to take the status of county seat for itself, but the two cities made an agreement that moved some county offices and courts to Lansing in exchange for Mason remaining the county seat. As a result, Michigan is the only state in the country with a capital city that is not also a county seat.

Up into the early 1900s, the local Ojibwa tribe had a visible presence in the town. In the 1900s, The Wyeth Corporation began producing baby formula in Mason, but that was discontinued in the 1990s. Today, it is home to the headquarters of Dart Container Corporation. Michigan Packaging Company, Gestamp Hardtech, and Ingham Intermediate School District also have facilities in the Mason area. Cattle can still be seen grazing within the city limits.

== Geography ==
According to the United States Census Bureau, the city has a total area of 5.13 square miles (13.29 km^{2}), of which 5.10 square miles (13.21 km^{2}) is land and 0.03 square miles (0.08 km^{2}) is water. Sycamore Creek flows through the city.

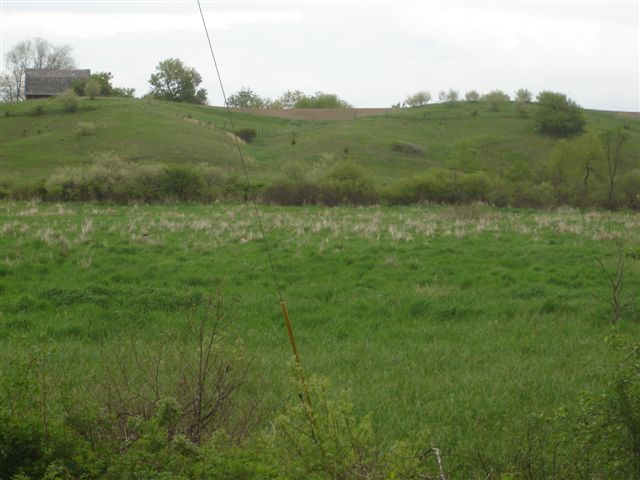
A part of the Mason Esker

Mason sits upon the Mason Esker, which is one of the longest eskers in the western hemisphere.

== Transportation ==
- US 127
- M-36
- The Capital Area Transportation Authority (CATA) provides bus service from Lansing to Mason. Route 46 runs weekdays from downtown Lansing to the southside of Mason. The Mason Connector runs weekdays and Saturday from south Lansing to Mason.
- Jewett Field is a general aviation airport located southeast of Mason. Scheduled passenger air carrier flights are provided by Capital Region International Airport located at the northwest corner of Ingham County.

== Demographics ==
Historical population
| Census | Pop. | Note | %± |
|---|---|---|---|
| 1860 | 363 | | — |
| 1870 | 1,212 | | 233.9% |
| 1880 | 1,809 | | 49.3% |
| 1890 | 1,875 | | 3.6% |
| 1900 | 1,828 | | −2.5% |
| 1910 | 1,742 | | −4.7% |
| 1920 | 1,879 | | 7.9% |
| 1930 | 2,575 | | 37.0% |
| 1940 | 2,867 | | 11.3% |
| 1950 | 3,514 | | 22.6% |
| 1960 | 4,522 | | 28.7% |
| 1970 | 5,468 | | 20.9% |
| 1980 | 6,019 | | 10.1% |
| 1990 | 6,768 | | 12.4% |
| 2000 | 6,714 | | −0.8% |
| 2010 | 8,252 | | 22.9% |
| 2020 | 8,283 | | 0.4% |
U.S. Decennial Census

=== 2020 census ===
As of the 2020 census, Mason had a population of 8,283. The median age was 39.1 years. 22.4% of residents were under the age of 18 and 18.6% of residents were 65 years of age or older. For every 100 females there were 91.7 males, and for every 100 females age 18 and over there were 89.5 males age 18 and over.

98.8% of residents lived in urban areas, while 1.2% lived in rural areas.

There were 3,490 households in Mason, of which 29.5% had children under the age of 18 living in them. Of all households, 43.2% were married-couple households, 16.9% were households with a male householder and no spouse or partner present, and 33.0% were households with a female householder and no spouse or partner present. About 33.4% of all households were made up of individuals and 15.0% had someone living alone who was 65 years of age or older.

There were 3,674 housing units, of which 5.0% were vacant. The homeowner vacancy rate was 0.7% and the rental vacancy rate was 6.7%.

Racial composition as of the 2020 census
| Race | Number | Percent |
|---|---|---|
| White | 7,321 | 88.4% |
| Black or African American | 243 | 2.9% |
| American Indian and Alaska Native | 16 | 0.2% |
| Asian | 108 | 1.3% |
| Native Hawaiian and Other Pacific Islander | 1 | 0.0% |
| Some other race | 87 | 1.1% |
| Two or more races | 507 | 6.1% |
| Hispanic or Latino (of any race) | 388 | 4.7% |

=== 2010 census ===
As of the census of 2010, there were 8,252 people, 3,278 households, and 2,032 families residing in the city. The population density was 1,618.0 inhabitants per square mile (624.7/km^{2}). There were 3,574 housing units at an average density of 700.8 per square mile (270.6/km^{2}). The racial makeup of the city was 90.2% White, 5.9% African American, 0.4% Native American, 0.9% Asian, 0.8% from other races, and 1.7% from two or more races. Hispanic or Latino of any race were 3.7% of the population.

There were 3,278 households, of which 30.4% had children under the age of 18 living with them, 44.8% were married couples living together, 13.3% had a female householder with no husband present, 3.9% had a male householder with no wife present, and 38.0% were non-families. 32.6% of all households were made up of individuals, and 11.6% had someone living alone who was 65 years of age or older. The average household size was 2.29 and the average family size was 2.91.

The median age in the city was 37.8 years. 21.8% of residents were under the age of 18; 9.6% were between the ages of 18 and 24; 29.5% were from 25 to 44; 25.7% were from 45 to 64; and 13.5% were 65 years of age or older. The gender makeup of the city was 50.8% male and 49.2% female.

=== 2000 census ===
As of the census of 2000, there were 6,714 people, 2,806 households, and 1,826 families residing in the city. The population density was 1,466.6 inhabitants per square mile (566.3/km^{2}). There were 2,961 dwelling units at an average density of 646.8 per square mile (249.7/km^{2}). The racial makeup of the city was 95.98% White, 0.64% African American, 0.46% Native American, 0.71% Asian, 0.74% from other races, and 1.46% from two or more races. Hispanic or Latino of any race were 2.73% of the population.

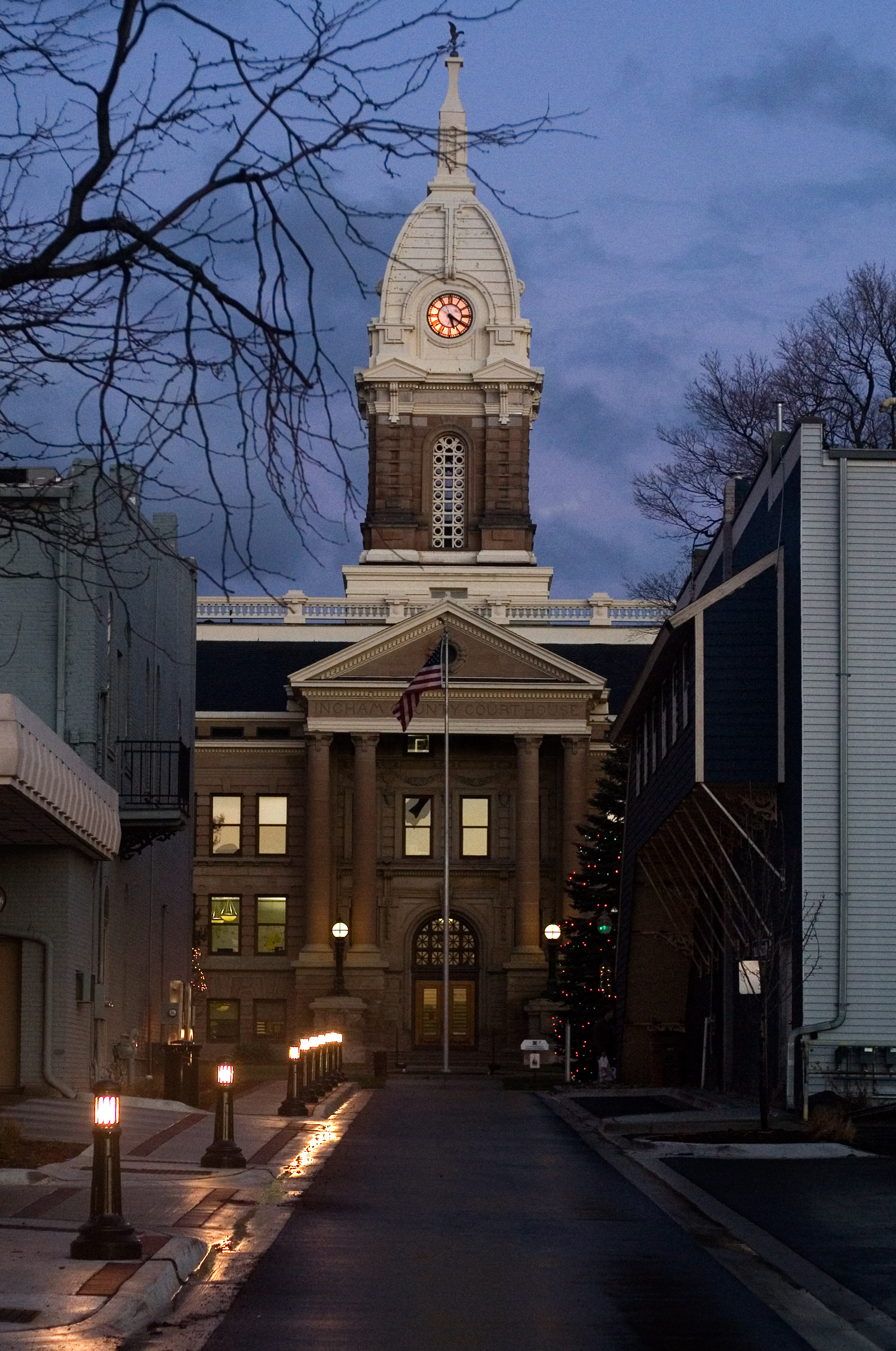
Ingham County Courthouse

There were 2,806 households, out of which 33.0% had children under the age of 18 living with them, 48.7% were married couples living together, 12.5% had a female householder with no husband present, and 34.9% were non-families. 30.4% of all households were made up of individuals, and 11.0% had someone living alone who was 65 years of age or older. The average household size was 2.38 and the average family size was 2.96.

In the city, the population was spread out, with 25.6% under the age of 18, 8.3% from 18 to 24, 30.7% from 25 to 44, 22.0% from 45 to 64, and 13.4% who were 65 years of age or older. The median age was 36 years. For every 100 females, there were 89.8 males. For every 100 females age 18 and over, there were 85.0 males.

The median income for a household in the city was $41,790, and the median income for a family was $53,519. Males had a median income of $41,081 versus $26,266 for females. The per capita income for the city was $20,866. About 1.3% of families and 4.1% of the population were below the poverty line, including 1.7% of those under age 18 and 7.6% of those age 65 or over

== Economy ==
- The Mason area is home to Dart Container Corporation, the largest manufacturer of foam cups and containers in the world. Dart is known for being vertically integrated, and is one of the largest privately owned corporations in Michigan. Dart Container also owns Solo.

== Notable people ==
- Steve Clark — soccer player
- Ion Cortright — a 1907 graduate of Mason High School, was a college football and men's basketball coach; during his coaching career, he was head coach for the University of South Dakota, University of Cincinnati, and North Dakota Agricultural College (now North Dakota State University)
- Alan Curtis — born in Mason in 1934 and a graduate of Mason High School in 1951, was a harpsichordist, musicologist and conductor of baroque opera
- David Feintuch — author of the science fiction series the Seafort Saga, was a longtime resident of Mason
- Kristin Haynie — a former point guard, who played in college basketball at Michigan State University; she played professionally in the Women's National Basketball Association and Europe, currently serves as Head Women’s Basketball Coach at Central Michigan University
- John W. Longyear — a judge and politician, moved to Mason in 1844, where he taught school and studied law
- Denny Stolz — a 1951 graduate of Mason High School, is a former college football coach; during his 23-year college coaching career, he was head coach for Alma College, Michigan State University, Bowling Green State University, and San Diego State University
- Floyd Wilcox — born in Mason in 1886, was the third president of Shimer College
- Malcolm X (then known as Malcolm Little) — spent part of his childhood in Mason.
