= Port Lansing =

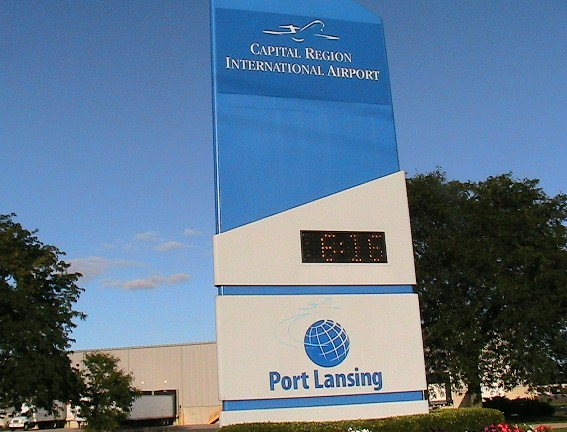
Port Lansing and Capital Region International Airport entrance sign from Grand River Ave in Lansing, Michigan

Port Lansing is a United States Port of Entry located at Capital Region International Airport in DeWitt Township, adjacent to Lansing, Michigan. The Port allows passengers and cargo to clear customs through a U.S. Customs and Border Protection Federal Inspection Station.

== History ==
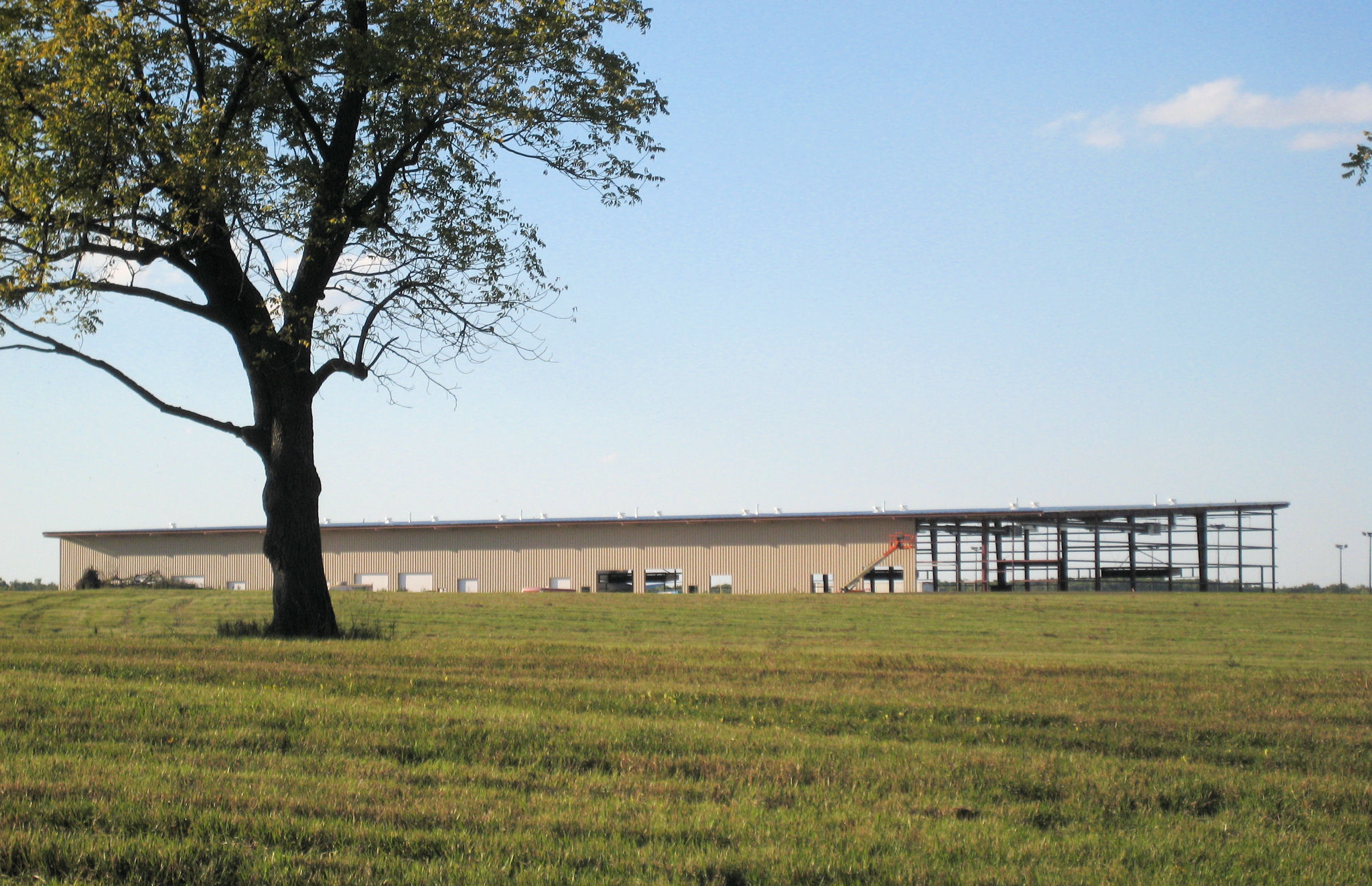
A 48,000 square feet (4,459 m^{2}) air cargo terminal under construction at the airport, October 2012 completion.

Capital Region International Airport was designated as a U.S. Port of Entry status in January 2008, with the name Port Lansing reflects this status. By June, a U.S. Customs Inspection Station was established at the airport. The 2,100 square feet (195 m^{2}) interim facility, near the west end of the terminal, could accommodate corporate and general aviation aircraft of up to 20 passengers per flight. In May 2009, a US Customs inspection station was opened at the east end of the terminal, in a space formerly used by Northwest Airlines for ticketing and check-in operations. The new 17,500 square feet (1,630 m^{2}), built at a cost of $4.3 million is capable of processing up to 200 passengers per hour.

To promote increased international commerce in and around the airport, Foreign Trade Zone No. 275 was activated, effective August 21, 2009. The Foreign Trade Zone, designated by the U.S. Department of Commerce and U.S. Customs and Border Protection, is one of seven in Michigan. The trade zone includes 840 acres (3.40 km^{2}; 1.31 mi^{2}) of property near the airport terminal and runways. The trade zone allows goods to be delivered there duty-free — with reduced, deferred, or eliminated customs fees — providing a competitive advantage to companies doing business within the trade zone. According to the Capital Region Airport Authority, the airport has over 100 acres (0.40 km^{2}; 0.16 mi^{2}) of land available for immediate development and 825 acres (3.3 km^{2}; 1.3 mi^{2}) for future development.

In October 2010, Capital Region International Airport received a $1.1 million federal Economic Development Administration grant to support infrastructure construction around the airport's industrial park and nearby corporate hangars. Improvements include the extension of water lines, the installation of water and storm sewer lines, and access road upgrades.

In November 2010, the foreign trade zone was expanded to eight Michigan counties including Clinton, Eaton, Gratiot, Ingham, Jackson, Livingston, Shiawassee, and most of Isabella county. Companies in those eight counties can clear customs in Lansing, store freight in their own county, while utilizing tax incentives. The first international cargo shipment arrived through Port Lansing in May 2011.

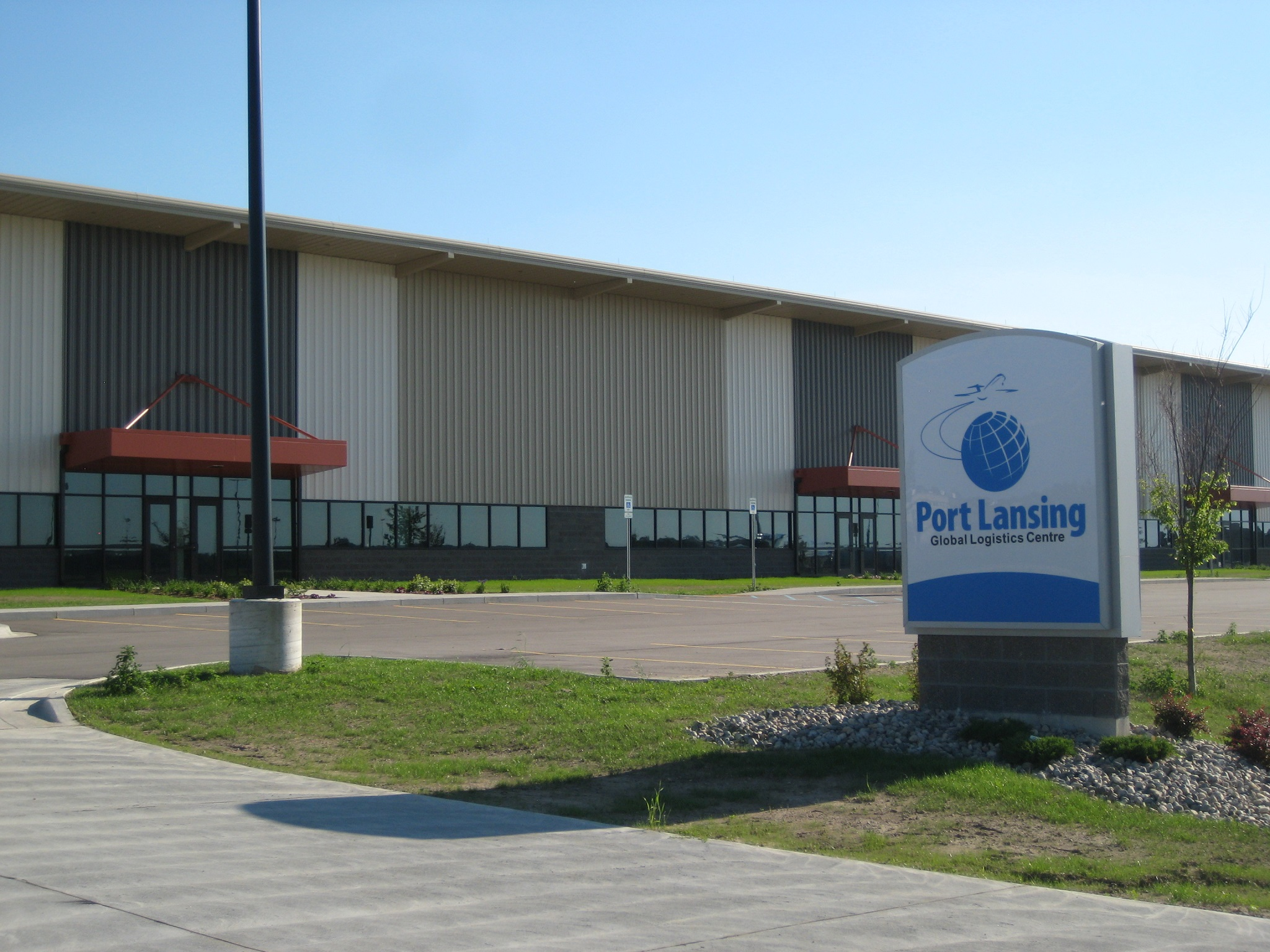
Completed cargo terminal at Capital Region International Airport

In January 2011, the airport, city of Lansing, and DeWitt Township announced a partnership with the goal of establishing an aerotropolis, designed to encourage economic development within 1 mile (1.6 km) of the airport. The plan includes a 50-year 425 land, tax, and services agreement between the city and township. In December 2011 the airport, city, and township received Next Michigan Development Corporation — or aerotropolis — designation from the Michigan Economic Development Corporation Strategic Fund board.

The Port Lansing Global Logistics Center, a $6 million 48,000 square feet (4,459 m^{2}) cargo warehouse and cross-docking facility, opened in October 2012. The logistics center, located in a 110 acres (45 ha) commerce park at the southeast end of the airport, functions as a freight consolidation center, foreign trade zone, and an import/export incubator. In March 2013, EMO Trans Customized Global Logistics opened a logistics office and warehouse operation at the logistics center. The operation is the region's first freight forwarder and customs broker.

In November 2013, Niowave, Inc. announced plans to build a 50,000 square feet (4,645 m^{2}) $202 million medical isotope and radiopharmaceutical production facility in the Next Michigan Development zone at the airport.

== Transportation ==
- Capital Region International Airport has three runways, the longest of which is 8,506 feet (2,593 m) long.
- Port Lansing is accessible by road from Grand River Avenue to the south (main entrance), Airport Road from the west, and DeWitt Road from the east. The Port is close to freeways I-69 (exits 84, 85), I-96 (exit 90), I-496 (exit 3), and US 127 (exit 82B). From downtown Lansing, drivers can follow westbound Business Loop I-96 (BL I-96) to the Port and airport.
- CATA Bus Route 14 runs between Port Lansing and downtown Lansing. To get to East Lansing or the Michigan State University campus, riders may transfer from the Lansing downtown end of Route 14 onto Route 1, Route 4, or Route 15.
- The CSX Plymouth Subdivision railway is located at the south end of the airport. The railway runs from Grand Rapids to Detroit.

== See also ==
- Airport of Entry
- List of free ports
- Capital Region International Airport
