= Capital Region International Airport =

Airport near Lansing, Michigan

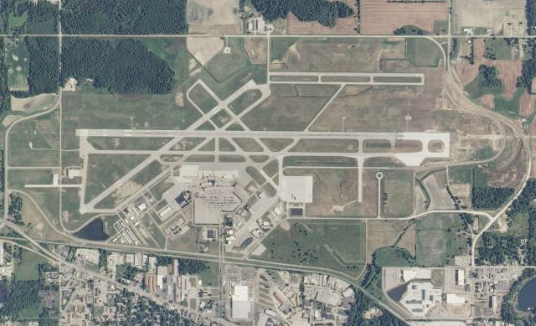
- IATA: LAN; ICAO: KLAN; FAA LID: LAN

Summary
- Airport type: Public
- Owner/Operator: Capital Region Airport Authority
- Serves: Lansing, Michigan
- Location: DeWitt Township, Clinton County, Michigan, USA
- Opened: May 1, 1926
- Time zone: Eastern (UTC−5)
  - Summer (DST): (UTC−4)
- Elevation AMSL: 861 ft (262 m)
- Coordinates: 42°46′43.1″N 84°35′10.3″W
- Website: www.flylansing.com

Maps
- FAA airport diagram
- Interactive map of Capital Region International Airport

Runways
Direction	Length		Surface
Direction	ft	m	Surface
10R/28L	8,506	2,593	Asphalt
10L/28R	3,601	1,098	Asphalt
06/24	5,003	1,525	Asphalt/concrete

Statistics (2025)
- Total passengers: 221,272 ▲3%
- Total enplanements: 111,954 ▲3%
- Total cargo (metric tons): 24,819 ▼10%
- Aircraft operations: 40,304 ▲12%
- Based aircraft: 65 ▲3%
- Sources: MDOT, FAA,

Capital Region International Airport (IATA: LAN, ICAO: KLAN, FAA LID: LAN), formerly Lansing Capital City Airport, is a public, Class C airport located 3 miles (5 km) northwest of downtown Lansing in a portion of DeWitt Township, Michigan that has been annexed to the City of Lansing via Public Act 425. Small areas of the airport are located in Watertown Township, and Delta Township. It is included in the Federal Aviation Administration (FAA) National Plan of Integrated Airport Systems for 2025–2029, in which it is categorized as a non-hub primary commercial service facility.

The airport is owned and operated by the Capital Region Airport Authority, an eight-member governing board. Three members represent Ingham County and three members represent the City of Lansing. Two ex officio members represent Eaton County and Clinton County. The Airport Authority also oversees nearby Jewett Field (TEW) in Mason.

The Michigan Department of Transportation reported 221,272 passengers flew to or from the airport in 2025.

== History ==
=== Early 1900s ===
The first recorded flight in Lansing took place on October 15, 1911, at an old racecourse (later the Red Cedar Golf Course). More than 20,000 spectators watched pilot Jimmy Ward perform stunts in the Shooting Star, his Curtiss biplane. In 1919, the first airfield in Lansing opened approximately 1 mile (1.6 km) west of downtown. The second airfield opened the following year 2.5 miles (4.0 km) south of downtown.^{[note 2]} From 1922 to 1926, Lansing's airport was Creyts Field, located 1 mile (1.6 km) west of the current airport. The 80 acres (32 ha) field was operated by Chamber of commerce Secretary Charley Davis. In 1925, Lt Harry Warner arrived in Lansing to help Davis and others select the current site for Capital City Airport. The selected site was a 300 acres (121 ha) state-owned hayfield and marsh (known as Chandler's Marsh), originally planned to be a boys' vocational school.

The first planes flew from the site northwest of Lansing on May 1, 1926. The formal dedication of Capital City Airport was held on the weekend of July 14–15, 1928, and was attended by 70,000 people, including arctic explorer George Hubert Wilkins and aviator Carl Eielson. Pilots from Selfridge Field and members of the Michigan National Guard 107th Observation Squadron performed in an exhibition air show. A Stinson Detroiter plane arrived at the airport with Lansing's first air mail delivery on July 5, 1928. Mayor Laird J. Troyer, Chamber of Commerce President Alton J. Hager, and airport committee chairman Clyde B. Smith, among others, were present to witness the plane's arrival. Regular cargo service from Capital City Airport began on July 17, 1928, via Transamerican Airlines. That day pilot C.V. Pickup departed with five sacks of mail en route to New York City. Lansing postmaster Walter G. Rogers was among those present to witness the event.

In 1929, J.D. Foster completed construction on a 60-by-120-foot, 7,200 square feet (669 m^{2}) aircraft hangar, the first building in what would become known as the Francis Aviation Complex at Capital City Airport. By the end of the year, fixed-base operators Foster Airways, SKF Air Service, Inc., and Wolverine Flying Service, Ltd. had constructed hangars at the airport. Passenger service commenced on September 1, 1929, by Kohler Aviation Corp. to Detroit and Milwaukee. By 1934, Pennsylvania Airlines and Transport was providing air mail and passenger service to Detroit, Grand Rapids, Muskegon, and across Lake Michigan. The Foster Hangar housed a flight school operated by Harvey Hughes from 1934 to 1936. In the late 1930s, Lansing aviator Lt Arthur J. Davis operated Michigan Airways, Inc. out of the hangar.

During World War II, Francis Aviation and Hughes Flying Service provided ground and flight training to 300 pilots per month as part of the U.S. Government's Civilian Pilot Training Program and War Training Service. The training included three weeks of instruction at Michigan State College and continued at Capital City Airport.

In 1940, the original terminal building, a 100-by-100-foot concrete hangar, and an adjoining office wing at the west end of the airport were built. The airport acquired 67 acres (27 ha) next to the north side of the airport, and runway 06/24 was extended by 1,000 feet (305 m). Pennsylvania Central Airlines began Douglas DC-3 service on June 5, 1940. The same year, the airport unsuccessfully bid for an $8.4 million Aircraft Engine Research Laboratory of the National Advisory Committee for Aeronautics.

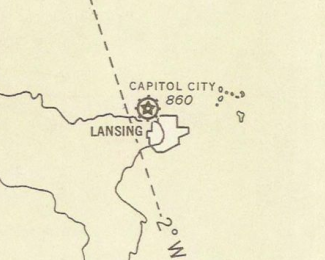
NOAA sectional chart of LAN airport, September 1935

=== 1950s–1970s ===
Demand for air service led to the building of the current terminal building in 1959. The terminal has had several renovations and additions since then. In April 1967, a new $38,000 observation room opened, where viewers can hear radio communications between pilots and the control tower through a loud speaker.

In the early 1960s, Lansing Community College leased the Francis Aviation Complex at Capital City Airport. The college moved to a new facility near the airport terminal in 1974. In March 1960, Francis Aviation Co. built two circular (roundtable) airport hangars costing $400,000 at the airport, believed to be the world's first. In 1963, Capital City Airport served over 100,000 passengers for the first time; by 1968, airport usage had surpassed 250,000 passengers. That April, 1968 presidential candidate and Senator Robert F. Kennedy landed at Capital City Airport. Later that year, presidential candidate and Senator George McGovern also landed at the airport.

In 1970, the Capital Region Airport Authority was created pursuant to Michigan Public Act Number 73. The following year, jurisdiction of Capital City Airport was transferred from the State of Michigan to the Airport Authority. The airport's first surveillance radar was installed in 1973. By 1977, the approach lighting system and instrument landing system for runway 10R were activated. The same year, Mason Jewett Field was purchased as a reliever airfield for Capital City Airport. A Michigan historical marker was erected at the terminal for local aviator Philip Orin Parmelee in 1978. From 1978 to 1991 fixed-base operator and aerial photography company White Star Photography purchased and operated from the Francis Aviation Complex.

=== 1980s–1990s ===
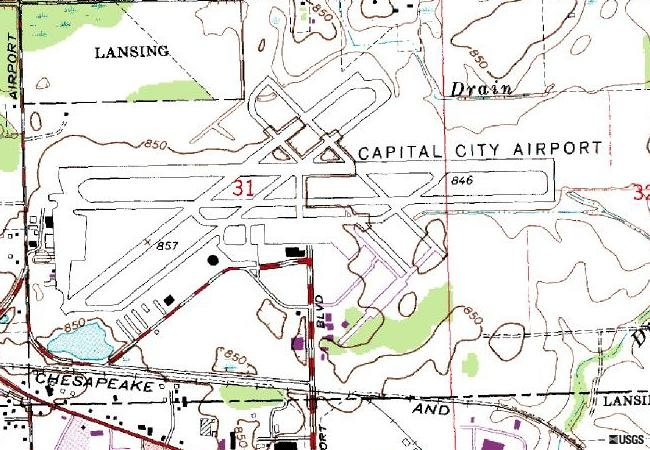
USGS topographic map of LAN airport,
July 1980

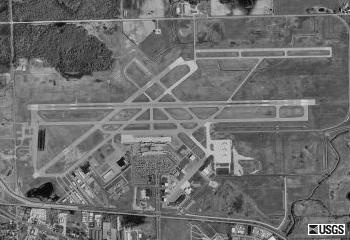
An April 1998 USGS aerial photo of
Capital Region International Airport

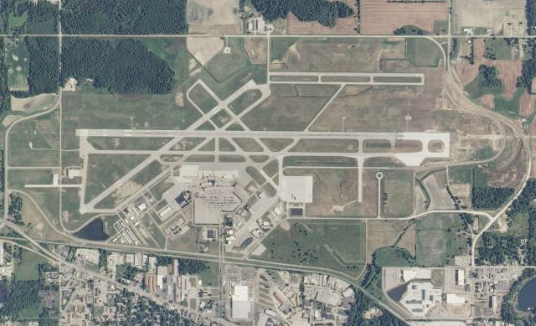
An April 2007 USGS airport aerial photo

In 1980, a 5,300 square feet (492 m^{2}) airport fire station was built. An air carrier terminal apron reconstruction followed in 1982. Between 1988 and 1990, runway 14/32 was decommissioned and became taxiway F.

In January 1987, United Airlines announced it was ending flights between Chicago O'Hare International Airport (ORD) and Lansing on April 5 after nearly 56 years of service. United Express, operated by Air Wisconsin, resumed the service to Chicago. In 1989, Thomas Schmidt was hired as Airport Manager, replacing Russ Brown, and airport usage surpassed 500,000 passengers for the first time.

During the 1990s, the Francis Aviation Complex was demolished for airport expansion and compliance with Federal Aviation Administration (FAA) regulations. UPS Airlines began cargo service from Lansing in 1990. In 1992, a major renovation of the terminal building, designed by Greiner, Inc., included the addition of 50,000 square feet (4,645 m^{2}) to the facility, began. The following year the public parking lot was reconstructed and a new airport surveillance radar (ASR-9) was activated.

President Bill Clinton landed at the airport aboard Air Force One on July 22, 1999, to hold a forum on Medicare at Lansing Community College.

=== 2000s ===
==== Flight reductions ====
During the 2000s, Lansing saw flights reduced from 35 to 12 a day. In May 2000 American Eagle Airlines ended its flights to Chicago–O'Hare, eliminating five daily flights and 23 positions at the Lansing airport. Chicago Express/ATA Connection Airlines ended service from Lansing to Midway International Airport (MDW) in 2001. In October 2003 US Airways ended daily flights to its Pittsburgh hub. Continental Airlines suspended its daily flights to Cleveland effective January 2004. In 2005 Midwest Connect ended service to Milwaukee (MKE). In September 2007 Continental Airlines announced three daily flights from Lansing to the airline's hub in Cleveland to begin in May 2008; however, rising fuel costs and the delay of terminal expansion plans at Cleveland Hopkins International Airport (CLE) caused Continental to suspend these flights before they began. Delta Air Lines announced in July 2008 that it was ending its three daily non-stop flights (via Comair) from Lansing to Cincinnati (CVG) effective September 1, eliminating 26 jobs at Lansing's airport. Delta also offered daily non-stop flights (via Atlantic Southeast Airlines) from Lansing to Atlanta from 2005 to 2007.

==== Low-cost airlines ====
Several low-cost carriers had flights at Lansing with varying success. In July 2003, Allegiant Air began nonstop flights from Lansing to Las Vegas McCarran International Airport (LAS). The addition of the low-cost carrier enabled the average fare from Lansing to drop by 35%. Over the next few years, Allegiant added flights to Orlando/Sanford (SFB) – the airline's second market from Orlando–Sanford – in May 2005 and St. Petersburg-Clearwater (PIE) in December 2006. In November 2008 Allegiant announced that it would depart Lansing's airport and move to nearby Grand Rapids Gerald R. Ford International Airport (GRR) effective January 2009, citing reduced competition from Detroit Metro Airport and financial incentives as the reasons for the move. In July 2004 Independence Air began nonstop flights from Lansing to Washington, D.C.'s Dulles International Airport (IAD). Northwest Airlines soon followed with similar flights to Dulles. Up to 11 direct flights a day were offered from Lansing to Washington, D.C. between the two airlines, with some flights as low as $29. Independence Air left the Lansing market in January 2005, citing high fuel prices and heavy competition from Northwest. In June 2005 Northwest moved their Lansing flights from Dulles to Reagan National Airport (DCA). By January 2006 Northwest canceled this route, leaving Lansing with no direct flights to Washington, D.C. In March 2009 start-up carrier JetAmerica (previously known as Air Azul) announced direct flights starting in July 2009 between Lansing, Newark, and Baltimore. However, after delaying the start of flights, the company folded on July 17 without operating a single flight.

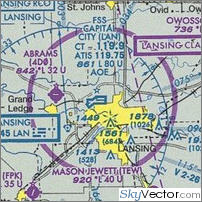
LAN airport on the Detroit Sectional Chart

==== International flights ====
There have been several attempts at establishing international passenger service at the airport. In April 2004, Laker Airways Bahamas Ltd. announced flights from Lansing to the Bahamas, with an intermediate stop at Rickenbacker International Airport (LCK) in Columbus, Ohio, to begin that fall. In January 2008, Kenny Tours announced non-stop flights from Lansing to Shannon, Ireland, dubbed the Shamrock Express, to begin in June 2008. In both cases, the service was canceled before flights began. Apple Vacations announced in July 2009 that, starting in December, they would offer weekly seasonal flights to Cancún, Mexico on USA3000 Airlines. These were the first non-stop international passenger flights from Lansing.

==== Facility upgrades and closures ====
In 2005 a 750 feet (229 m) extension to runway 10R/28L was completed. By November 2008 a 500 feet (152 m) extension to the runway – now 8,506 feet (2,593 m) – was completed to allow for larger aircraft to use the airport. The $9.9 million project required the temporary closure of nearby DeWitt Road.

In January 2008 Capital Region International Airport was designated as an International Port of Entry into the United States, with Customs and Border Protection officers on duty to process international passengers and air freight. By May 2009 a new 14,000 square feet (1,301 m^{2}) federal inspection station opened in the terminal, capable of processing 200 passengers per hour.

In March 2009 the Federal Aviation Administration announced the planned consolidation of radar control for Lansing's airport, as well as that of airports in Grand Rapids and Muskegon, to nearby Kalamazoo/Battle Creek International Airport in 2013. The cost-saving move will occur upon completion of Kalamazoo Airport's new air traffic control tower (TRACON). Despite the consolidation, each airport will still maintain its own air traffic control tower.

In November 2009 Lockheed Martin, operator of the flight service station located at Capital Region International Airport, announced the closing of the service station, effective February 2010. The Lansing station was one of 13 to close nationwide and provided 25 jobs and $120,000 in annual rent to the airport.

=== 2010s ===
==== Domestic flights ====
In October 2010 the airport was awarded a U.S. Department of Transportation Small Community Air Service Development grant, worth $750,000, to help reestablish nonstop flights from Lansing to Washington, D.C. These grants are designed to promote air service development from smaller markets. Washington, D.C. is the number one end destination from Lansing, according to the Capital Region Airport Authority. In December Sun Country Airlines announced that it would offer non-stop flights from Lansing to Minneapolis (MSP) and Washington–Reagan (DCA) beginning in April 2011. The announcement followed the airline being awarded two landing slots at the Washington, D.C. airport by the USDOT. The Minneapolis route is expected to reduce the fares from Lansing-Minneapolis an average of 34%, and the Washington, D.C. flights reduced by an average of 21%. In July 2015 Sun Country announced that Minneapolis and Washington, D.C. flights would be discontinued in October.

American Airlines resumed the Washington, D.C. flights in July 2016, continuing a slot exemption that Sun Country previously held at Washington–Reagan. The slot exemption, set to expire in October 2019, was extended through October 2023. American Airlines also resumed Chicago flights in August 2016 after a 16-year absence from Lansing.

Allegiant Air again operated twice-weekly flights to Orlando/Sanford (SFB) from November 2012 through January 2015.

President Barack Obama landed at the airport aboard Air Force One on February 7, 2014, to sign the 2014 U.S. Farm Bill at Michigan State University.

==== International flights ====
In June 2010 Apple Vacations and Sun Country Airlines announced seasonal flights to Cancún, Mexico (CUN/MMUN); Montego Bay, Jamaica (MBJ/MKJS); Fort Myers (RSW); Orlando (MCO); and Las Vegas (LAS) beginning in December.

In May 2011 Apple Vacations and Sun Country Airlines announced seasonal weekly flights to Punta Cana, Dominican Republic (PUJ/MDPC) beginning in December and discontinued flights to Fort Myers and Las Vegas (the latter would resume in December 2012). In June 2012 similar seasonal flights to Puerto Vallarta, Mexico (PVR/MMPR) were announced starting in February and Montego Bay flights were discontinued.

In May 2013 Apple Vacations announced that Frontier Airlines will operate their seasonal international flights from Lansing, beginning in January 2014. The next year Aeroméxico and Interjet operated seasonal flights to Cancún and Puerto Vallarta. Sunwing Airlines resumed seasonal flights to Cancún in December 2015. Miami Air International and Swift Air resumed seasonal flights to Cancún and Punta Cana in December 2016 and 2017 respectively.

Apple Vacations resumed flights to Cancún and Punta Cana, and add Montego Bay in December 2018.

==== Facility upgrades ====
A Concierge Travel Center opened at the airport in May 2010, offering the ability to book airline tickets, cruises, tours, car rentals, and hotel rooms.

In January 2011 the Airport Authority, city of Lansing, and DeWitt Township announced a 50-year 425 land, tax, and services agreement at the airport between the city and township.

In July 2011 Eastern Michigan University announced that its flight-training program would begin operating out of the Lansing airport in September, coinciding with the elimination of Lansing Community College's aviation flight program. The Transportation Security Administration (TSA) installed a full-body millimeter wave scanner at the airport in October.

The TSA began offering pre-check clearance at the airport in April 2015.

=== 2020s ===
Airline startup Avelo Airlines launched flights from Lansing to Orlando in October 2022. The airline initially operated the route two times per week. The route was launched alongside a nearly-identical route to Kalamazoo. Lansing is part of Avelo's plan to connect unique city pairs in underserved markets, especially focusing on "small hometown airports." The airline used Boeing 737 aircraft bigger than the regional jets flown by other carriers. Breeze Airways announced their addition of Lansing for the winter 2024-25 season with service to Orlando and Ft. Myers. Shortly thereafter, Avelo announced their departure from Lansing and Kalamazoo.

United Airlines initially pulled flights from Lansing to Chicago O'Hare in January 2022 citing changes in the long-term sustainability of its regional routes from COVID, citing a pilot shortage and the slow return of air travelers following the COVID-19 pandemic impacted revenues. In 2020, federal officials allowed United to suspend flights into and out of Lansing's airport for several months because of plummeting demand tied to the pandemic. On January 27, 2026, United announced the return of this route to compete with American Airlines and will offer four daily flights between the two cities beginning May 7, 2026.

== Current and future development ==
The Mid-Michigan Business Travel Coalition, Inc., formerly the Lansing Regional Business Travel Trust, was formed by the Airport Authority and the Lansing Regional Chamber of commerce in 2004. A coalition of the local business, education, and government community, the Travel Coalition seeks to promote the airport through negotiations with air carriers and area promotions.

In December 2011 the airport, city of Lansing, and DeWitt Township received Next Michigan Development Corporation – or Aerotropolis – designation, designed to encourage economic development within 1 mile (1.6 km) of the airport. The plan includes a 50-year 425 land, tax, and services agreement between the city and township.

In October 2018 the airport announced the establishment of a Lansing Brewing Company-themed restaurant and bar, and a new coffee cafe, to open in late 2019.

=== Master Plan ===
The airport's most recent Master Plan was released in December 2006. The Plan identifies four major goals for the airport: Retain and expand scheduled passenger flights, increase charter operations, increase corporate and general aviation activities, and increase cargo activities. In order to achieve these goals, the airport over the long term endeavors to, among other things:

- Construct a new terminal building at the airport
- Interim terminal improvements including additional passenger loading bridges, rental car, and baggage claim facilities, and passenger security screening improvements
- Construct a new control tower
- Construct a new 9,000 feet (2,743 m) runway and connector taxiway to replace the existing 10L/28R runway
- Extend the existing 06/24 runway to 7,785 feet (2,373 m)
- Expand vehicle parking lot parking areas
- Local road improvements for better access to nearby freeway I-69
- Expand the existing business park at the airport
- Cargo and sort facility expansions
- T-hangar and access taxiway expansions for general aviation

=== Port Lansing ===
The airport received U.S. Port of entry status in January 2008. The name "Port Lansing" reflects this designation. Capital City Airport was renamed "Capital Region International Airport" to emphasize the Port of Entry status. By June an interim U.S. Customs Inspection Station was established. To promote increased international commerce in and around the airport, a Foreign Trade Zone was activated, effective August 24, 2009. The Foreign Trade Zone includes 840 acres (3.40 km^{2}; 1.31 mi^{2}) of property near the terminal and runways. The trade zone allows goods to be delivered there duty-free – with reduced, deferred, or eliminated customs fees – providing a competitive advantage to companies doing business within the trade zone.

The Port Lansing Global Logistics center, a $6 million 48,000 square feet (4,459 m^{2}) cargo warehouse and cross-docking facility, opened at the airport in October 2012. According to the Airport Authority, the airport has over 100 acres (0.40 km^{2}; 0.16 mi^{2}) of land available for immediate development.

== Facilities and operations ==
Capital Region International Airport covers 2,160 acres (8.74 km^{2}; 3.37 mi^{2}). Located at the boundary of three counties, most of the airport lies in DeWitt Township (Clinton County), with small portions in Watertown Township (Clinton County), Delta Township (Eaton County), and the city of Lansing (Ingham County).^{[note 1]}

=== Terminal ===
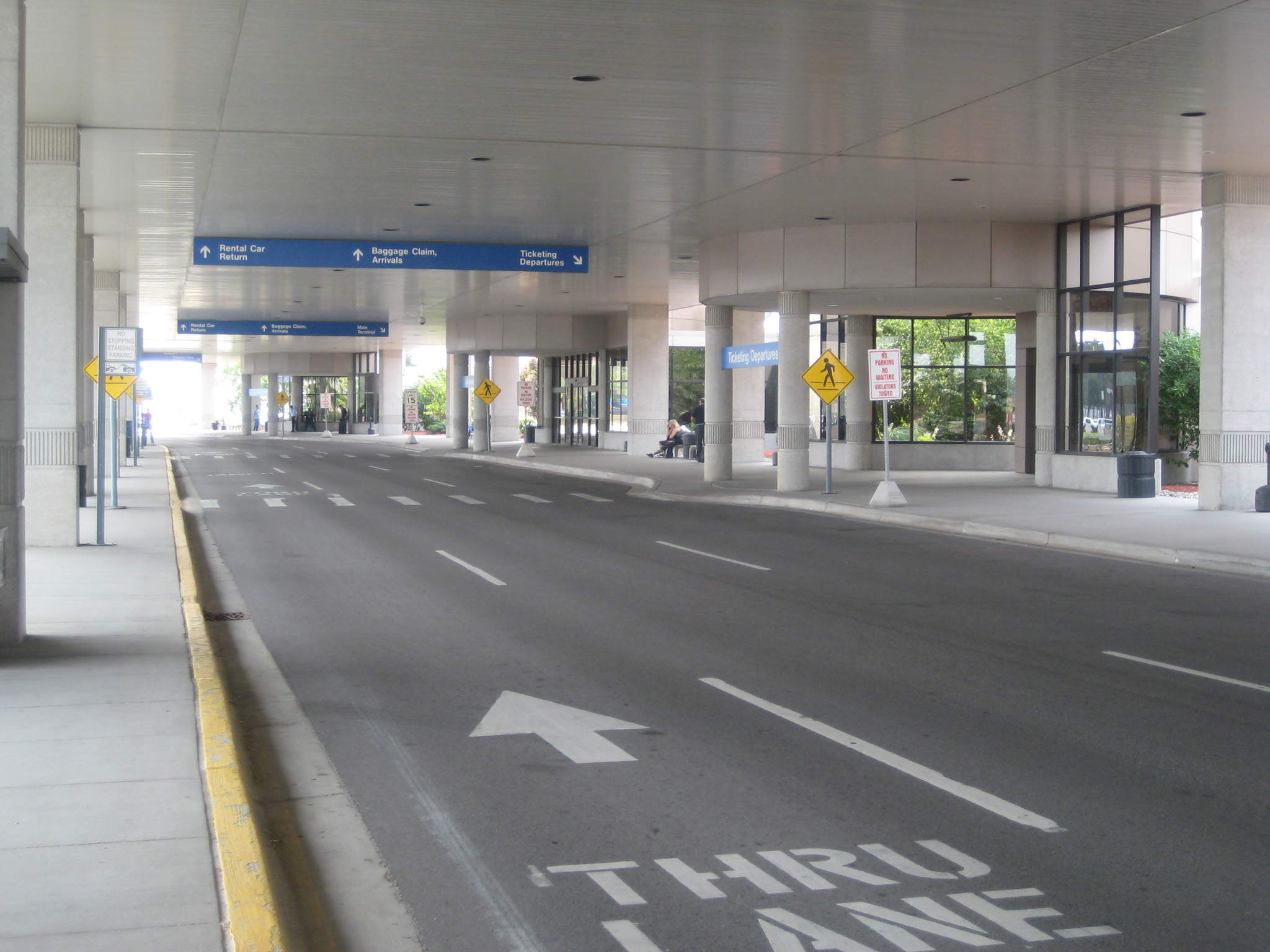
Drive along front of airport terminal building

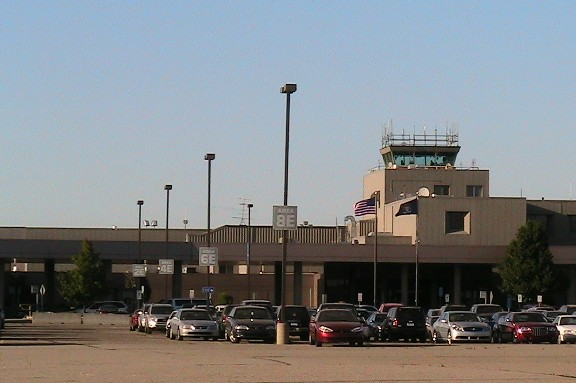
Airport terminal with short term parking lot in foreground

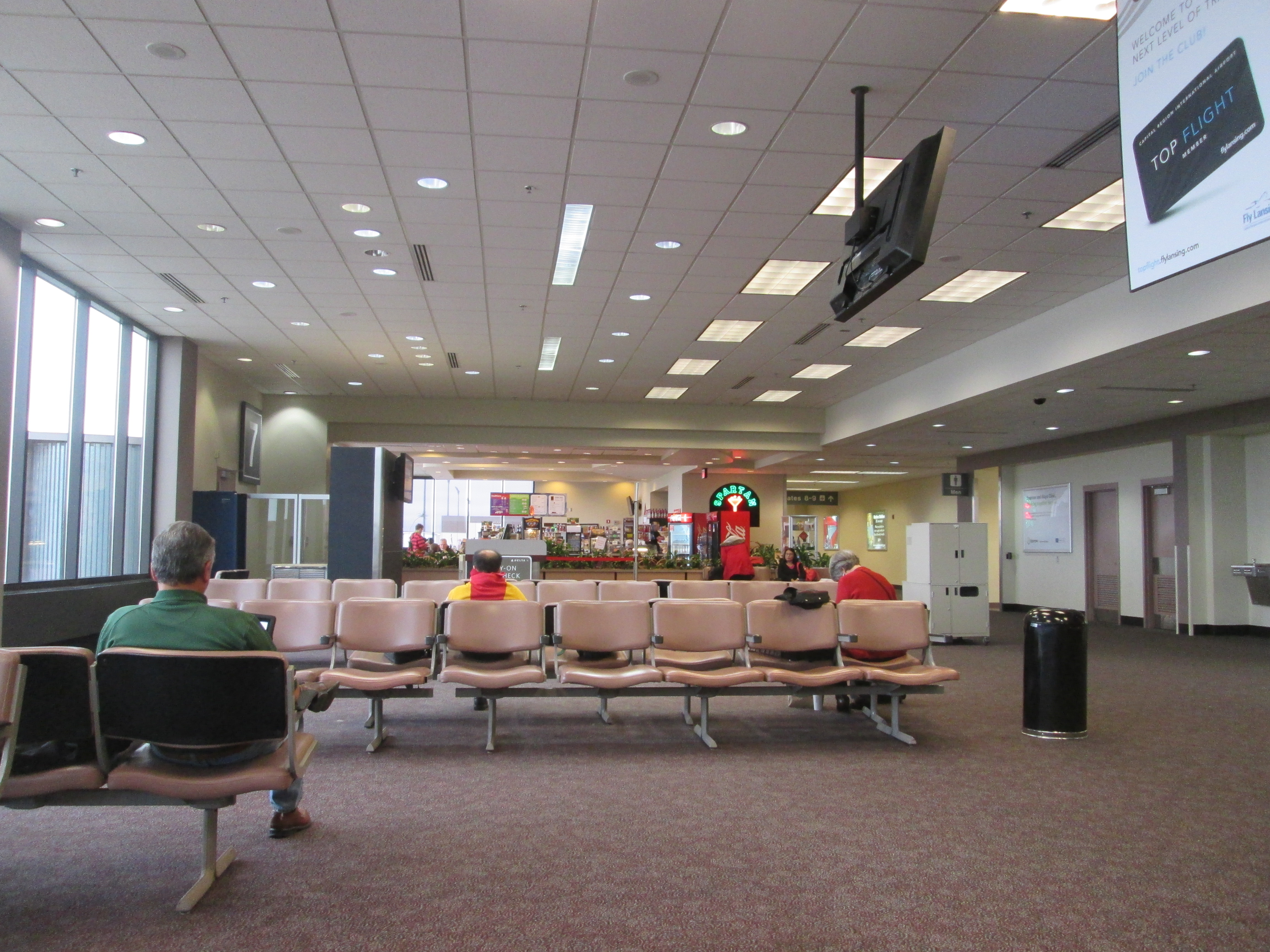
Airport terminal second floor seating at departure gate 7

The current terminal building, constructed in 1959, is 161,500 square feet (15,004 m^{2}) and has four floors. The lower two floors are passenger levels. The third floor houses the airport's administrative offices and the fourth floor contains the control tower. The terminal has nine gates, including six jetways. Located in the terminal is the Capital Market, Café Lan, on the first level of the terminal, is a full-service restaurant and grill serving breakfast, lunch, and dinner. Then in 2019, Capital Brewport opened. This restaurant offers many Lansing-made beers. The Concierge Travel Center offers the ability to book airline tickets, cruises, hotels, tours, foreign currency exchange, and limousine rentals. The Spartan Pub, on the second level, is a cocktail bar and coffee shop (serving Biggby Coffee brand) with a deli menu. A business center is located near gate 6, and it provides complimentary wireless (SSID "CRAA") Internet access.

=== Aeronautics ===
The Michigan Department of Transportation Office of Aeronautics is located along the airport's southeast ramp. The Michigan State Transportation Commission meets at the airport monthly; the Michigan Aeronautics Commission meets at the airport bimonthly.

=== Runways ===
Capital Region International Airport has three runways:

- Runway 10R/28L: 8,506 feet (2,593 m) x 150 feet (46 m), Surface: Asphalt, grooved, ILS equipped
- Runway 06/24: 5,003 feet (1,525 m) x 120 feet (37 m), Surface: Asphalt/Concrete, grooved
- Runway 10L/28R: 3,601 feet (1,098 m) x 75 feet (23 m), Surface: Asphalt

=== Parking ===
The airport has both short and long term parking lots, with a combined capacity of 1,500 parking spaces. There is a 15-minute grace period in the short term parking lot. The short term lot is closer to the terminal building, though the long term lot generally provides lower rates. Several area hotels participate in the airport's "Park and Fly" program, in that they offer special room rates and free shuttle service for airport patrons.

=== Aircraft operations ===
For the 12-month period ending December 31, 2021, the airport had 28,500 total aircraft operations an average of 78 per day, down from 93 per day in 2016. The 2016 figure itself was a 16% decrease from 2012 and a 59% decrease from 2007. 48% of the 2021 aircraft operations were general aviation, 42% were air taxi, 8% were scheduled commercial, and 2% were military. There were 62 aircraft based on the field: 31 single-engine and 18 multi-engine airplanes, 10 jets, and 4 helicopters.

Passenger aircraft landings dropped from 12,224 in 2000 to 3,623 in 2009, according to the Capital Region Airport Authority. In March 2012 the average daily seats on domestic departures from the airport was 912, a 24.9% increase from March 2011.

On-time performance for domestic flights at Capital Region International Airport
Year	Departure %	Arrival %	% canceled
2005	84%	76%	3.3%
2006	81%	73%	3.5%
2007	76%	69%	5.2%
2008	78%	72%	4.5%
2009	87%	81%	2.7%
2010	85%	77%	3.1%
2011	75%	71%	7.6%
2012	77%	71%	4.1%
2013	81%	73%	2.9%
2014	73%	67%	6.8%
2015	85%	81%	2.3%
2016	85%	81%	2.1%
2017	85%	82%	1.4%
2018	85%	82%	1.8%
2019	79%	77%	1.58%

== Airlines and destinations ==
=== Passenger ===
Airlines	Destinations
American Eagle	Chicago–O'Hare, Washington–National
Breeze Airways	Orlando; Seasonal: Fort Myers
Delta Connection	Detroit

=== Passenger statistics ===
The peak year for passenger activity at Capital Region International Airport was in 1997 with 720,365 total passengers. In 1990 the airport had 149,939 total aircraft operations.

Passenger and aircraft operation totals for Capital Region International Airport
Year	Total passengers (% change)	Aircraft operations (% change)
2000	656,703(−8.7%)	113,420(−7.2%)
2001	523,152(−20.3)	101,061(−10.9%)
2002	514,299(−1.7%)	93,628(−7.4%)
2003	534,280(+3.9%)	92,580(−1.1%)
2004	650,915(+21.8%)	95,396(+3.0%)
2005	609,901(−6.3%)	81,607(−14.5%)
2006	557,417(−8.6%)	80,645(−1.2%)
2007	497,824(−10.7%)	75,136(−6.8%)
2008	429,639(−13.7%)	46,538(−38.1%)
2009	265,967(−38.1%)	42,162(−9.4%)
2010	257,350(−3.2%)	42,466(+0.7%)
2011	358,307(+39.2%)	38,287(−9.8%)
2012	389,600(+8.7%)	36,438(−4.8%)
2013	418,850(+7.5%)	31,788(−12.8%)
2014	376,790(−10.0%)	34,914(+9.8%)
2015	323,510(−14.1%)	33,907(−2.9%)
2016	314,659(−2.7%)	33,846(−0.1%)
2017	373,843(+18.8%)	33,499(−1.0%)
2018	351,823(−5.9%)	33,567(+0.0%)
2019	341,085(−3.1%)	31,206(-7.0%)
2020	128,175(−62.4%)	24,485(-21.5%)
2021	180,385(+40.7%)	28,492(+16.3%)
2022	168,248(-6.7%)	28,464(-0.1%)
2023	218,752(+23.1%)	30,330(+6.2%)
2024	214,948(-1.8%)	35,947(+15.6%)
2025	221,272(+2.9%)	40,304(+10.8%)

Top non-stop domestic destinations from Capital Region International Airport (September 2025 – August 2026)
Rank	Airport	Total passengers	Carriers
1	Detroit, MI (DTW)	52,270	Delta
2	Chicago, IL (ORD)	31,450	American
3	Orlando, FL (MCO)	12,060	Breeze
4	Washington, D.C. (DCA)	9,500	American
5	Fort Myers, FL (RSW)	6,630	Breeze

Top passenger carriers at Capital Region International Airport (September 2025 – August 2026)
Carrier	Total passengers	% share
SkyWest	80,820	36.75%
Envoy	61,150	27.80%
Breeze	36,470	16.58%
Endeavor	20,780	9.45%
PSA	20,660	9.39%
Other	70	0.03%

Largest markets from Capital Region International Airport Number of passengers both ways – Q4 2023

Rank	Market (airports)	PDEW
1	Orlando	102
2	Washington DC	63
3	New York City	19
4	Los Angeles	16
4	Chicago	16

=== Competition ===
Capital Region International Airport competes with nearby Detroit Metropolitan Airport (DTW), Grand Rapids' Gerald R. Ford International Airport (GRR), and the recent growth of Flint's Bishop International Airport (FNT). In addition, the Michigan Flyer provides motorcoach service roundtrip from nearby East Lansing to Detroit Metro Airport 12 times daily. In 2006, the Capital Region Airport Authority estimated that the airport lost approximately 162,000 passengers that year to nearby competing airports. The airport lost about $53 million in annual revenue as a result of the passenger losses. According to the Airport Authority, a January 2010 leakage study found that 550,000 of the 873,000 airline tickets sold from mid-Michigan in 2009 were to travelers using other Michigan airports: 45% of travelers flew (originated) from Detroit Metro Airport, 37% from Lansing, 8% from Grand Rapids, and 7.6% from Flint. This resulted in an economic loss of $108 million to the Mid-Michigan region. The lost revenue to Lansing's airport was approximately $17 million.

In March 2009, the Lansing State Journal cited a 2008 Michigan State University study finding that passengers out of Capital Region International Airport feel the airport is convenient to use, but more than two-thirds of those surveyed also flew from other Michigan airports during the previous year. This is despite 84% of passengers being satisfied with the airline service offered at Lansing's airport, a drop from 93% passenger satisfaction in 2002. The 2008 study noted that 49% of travelers thought Lansing's airport was more expensive to fly out of than Detroit Metropolitan Airport; 13% of travelers thought Lansing was less expensive. The same study in 2002 found that 41% of travelers thought that Lansing was more expensive to fly out of than Detroit, and 14% thought Lansing was less expensive.

Forbes Magazine in February 2009 ranked Capital Region International Airport tied for the 18th most expensive airport to fly from in the United States, with an average fare of 35¢ per mile. The magazine ranked two other Michigan airports as more expensive. Cherry Capital Airport (TVC) in Traverse City was ranked second (41¢ per mile), and MBS International Airport (MBS) northwest of Saginaw was tied for the 11th most expensive airport in the country (36¢ per mile).

An April 2011, a New York Times study determined that the average fare from Capital Region International Airport was overpriced by $117. The regression analysis, based on third quarter 2010 data from the USDOT Bureau of Transportation Statistics, considered factors such as market size and average distance to destination. Fares at other Michigan airports were overpriced to a lesser extent: MBS airport by $114, Detroit Metro by $25, and Grand Rapids by $9; Flint airport was underpriced by $42. Kalamazoo airport fares were overpriced by $187.

Average domestic passenger fares for Capital Region International Airport and other nearby airports (origin cities)
Year	Lansing (LAN)	Detroit (DTW)	Grand Rapids (GRR)	Flint (FNT)	Kalamazoo (AZO)	Saginaw (MBS)
2006	$370.61	$322.83	$413.74	$298.89	$472.93	$441.26
2007	$364.39	$307.29	$420.68	$281.37	$471.01	$441.08
2008	$397.75	$334.18	$463.96	$314.89	$517.32	$481.39
2009	$434.59	$313.67	$409.85	$275.23	$500.55	$434.69
2010	$482.76	$353.75	$377.29	$298.40	$563.92	$470.47
2011	$433.59	$378.55	$400.11	$334.90	$579.23	$474.77
2012	$417.92	$404.96	$445.80	$372.96	$599.39	$465.86
2013	$391.67	$422.25	$442.34	$367.80	$575.49	$546.03
2014	$427.38	$429.93	$439.54	$376.15	$570.32	$537.51
2015	$473.93	$416.23	$421.46	$387.89	$576.16	$550.78
2016	$463.97	$376.53	$400.10	$360.74	$505.91	$522.24
2017	$426.42	$369.48	$408.57	$361.47	$532.52	$583.57
2018	$465.22	$373.37	$387.58	$347.30	$530.67	$542.79
2019	$441.67	$378.03	$374.78	$343.22	$479.81	$540.30
2020	$351.27	$313.78	$294.91	$243.40	$395.22	$464.82
2021	$349.75	$326.08	$322.06	$243.08	$395.08	$468.59
2022	$473.95	$425.35	$404.17	$257.29	$502.88	$579.18
2023	$410.36	$427.05	$413.12	$258.99	$428.03	$546.76
2024	$441.87	$431.74	$408.04	$249.31	$495.71	$575.67
2025	-	-	-	-	-	-

Airports included are within 100 miles (160 km) or a 100-minute drive of LAN. Source: Airline Origin & Destination Survey, Office of the Assistant Secretary for Research and Technology, Bureau of Transportation Statistics, USDOT

== Cargo ==
Cargo tenants at Capital Region International Airport moved 58,827,112 pounds (26,683,529 kg) of cargo in 2019.

Airlines	Destinations
Ameriflight	Escanaba, Ironwood, Houghton, Marquette, Pellston, Sault Ste. Marie (MI), Traverse City
Martinaire	Alpena, Harbor Springs, Muskegon, Pellston, Saginaw, Sault Ste. Marie (MI)
UPS Airlines	Chicago/Rockford, Louisville

- Ameriflight offers scheduled UPS feeder and on demand cargo services. The airport serves as a crew and maintenance base for the company.
- Martinaire offers scheduled and on demand air freight feeder services. In October 2006 Martinaire acquired a hangar facility at the airport.
- UPS Airlines is a worldwide cargo carrier owned by United Parcel Service. The majority of cargo flights are on Airbus A300F4-600, Boeing 757-200F, and Boeing 767-300F aircraft.

=== Cargo statistics ===
The peak year for total cargo activity at Capital Region International Airport was in 2007 with 65,415,031 pounds (29,671,759 kg) of cargo.

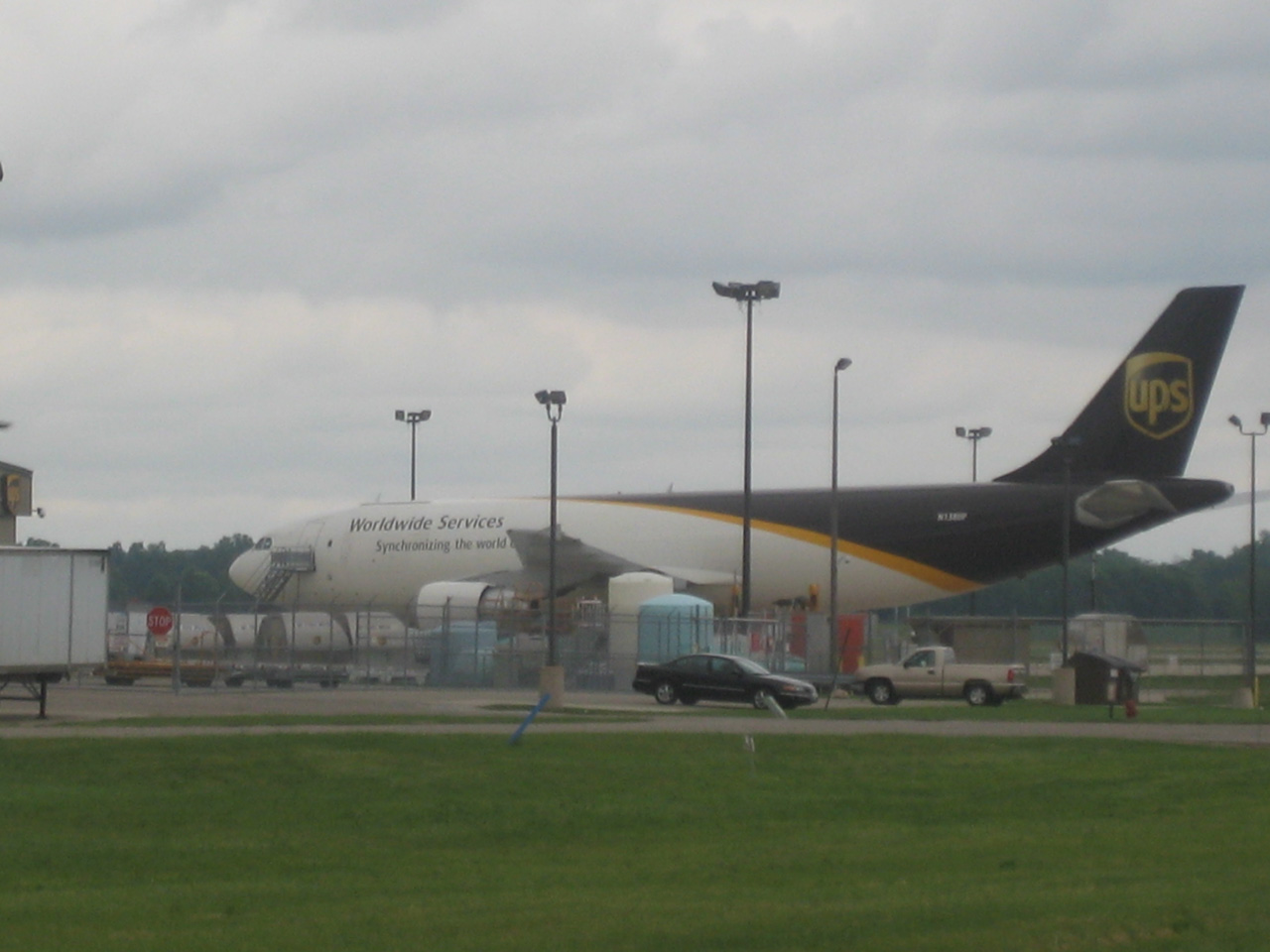
A UPS Airlines Airbus A300F4-600 on freight ramp

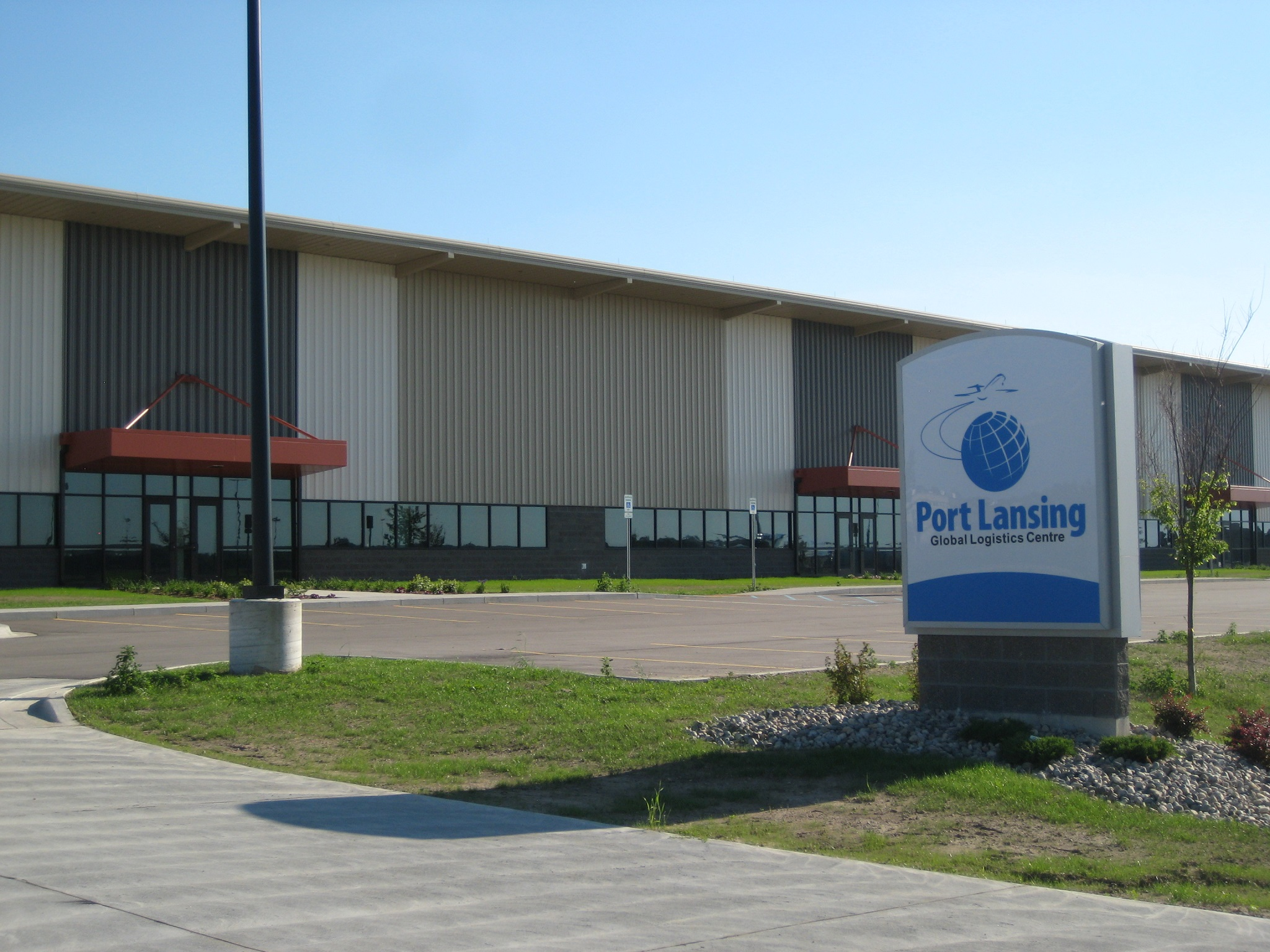
Cargo warehouse and logistics center near freight ramp

Cargo totals for Capital Region International Airport

Year	Total cargo (lbs)	% change
2000	64,844,276	+5.3%
2001	52,756,663	−18.6%
2002	49,997,799	−5.2%
2003	50,106,933	+0.2%
2004	52,791,955	+5.4%
2005	54,340,061	+2.9%
2006	60,057,174	+10.5%
2007	65,415,031	+8.9%
2008	53,341,818	−18.5%
2009	42,045,568	−21.2%

Year	Total cargo (lbs)	% change
2010	41,022,051	−2.4%
2011	41,479,938	+1.1%
2012	44,522,950	+7.3%
2013	44,189,278	−0.7%
2014	45,896,074	+3.9%
2015	48,526,286	+5.7%
2016	46,128,627	−4.9%
2017	48,732,775	+5.6%
2018	54,491,064	+11.8%
2019	58,827,112	+8.0%

== General and corporate aviation ==
Capital Region International Airport is served by two fixed-base operators.

- AvFlight provides charter, cargo, and freight services as well as aircraft maintenance. They operate a 24-hour facility at the airport with satellite weather, deicing, and fuel services.
- Beacon Aviation offers aircraft maintenance, inspections, and avionics certification, services, and autopilot installations.

In addition to nearby Mason Jewett Field (TEW) located 15 miles (24.1 km) southeast, other local general aviation airports include University Airpark (41G) 6 miles (9.7 km) northeast in Bath Township and Abrams Municipal Airport (4D0) 6 miles (9.7 km) west in Watertown Township.

== Ground transportation ==
- Lansing's airport is accessible by road from Grand River Avenue to the south (main entrance), Airport Road from the west, and DeWitt Road from the east. The airport is close to freeways I-69 (exits 84, 85), I-96 (exit 90), I-496 (exit 3), and U.S. Highway 127 (exit 82B). From downtown Lansing, traffic can follow Business Loop I-96 to the airport.
- Capital Area Transportation Authority (CATA) Bus Route 14 runs between the airport and downtown Lansing. To get to East Lansing or the Michigan State University campus, riders may transfer from the Lansing downtown end of Route 14 onto Route 1, Route 4, or Route 15.
- A CSX Transportation rail line is located at the south end of the airport. The railroad runs from Grand Rapids to Detroit.
- Short term and long term parking are available at lots close to the terminal building, as well as several car rental agencies and taxi services.

== Incidents and accidents ==
- On July 17, 1985, a single-engine plane, piloted by a passenger, landed at the airport after the pilot suffered a fatal heart attack. The plane, which departed from Flint, incurred a damaged nose and blown tire upon landing. The pilot of a nearby plane flew alongside and guided the troubled aircraft to the airport.
- In February 1988, Kenneth Hasson, of Los Angeles, was arrested for bringing 30 pounds (13.6 kg) of cocaine, worth $11 million, through the airport. Hasson and an accomplice were sentenced to life terms in prison.
- On May 20, 1990, a Piper PA-28-181 crashed in East Lansing on approach to the Lansing airport, fatally wounding the pilot. The single-engine plane, en route from Mason, encountered instrument problems and cloudy conditions.
- On February 11, 1991, a Glasair 3 two-passenger plane skidded off a runway into a field after experiencing problems with the landing gear. The plane caught fire; however, the pilot and passenger were not injured.
- On August 23, 1991, about 250 hamsters and gerbils shipped from Mississippi chewed through packing boxes, escaped, and scattered throughout Lansing's airport.
- On September 27, 1993, a Midwest Flying Service Aero Commander 690A twin-engine turbo prop crashed near Lansing en route to Battle Creek shortly after takeoff. The plane was experiencing electrical problems and reportedly changed direction and altitude continually before colliding with trees. The crew of two was killed.
- On June 6, 1996, Continental Express flight 3123 from Cleveland sustained minor damage from a small cockpit fire en route to Lansing. The Beech 1900 aircraft landed safely in Lansing with no injuries to the two crew and 16 passengers.
- On November 24, 2004, Northwest Airlines Flight 1933 from Detroit slid off the runway into a field. The flight had been delayed due to inclement weather. No injuries were reported.
- On July 22, 2007, Northwest Flight 619 to Minneapolis had to return to Lansing after takeoff due to smoke appearing in the cockpit. No injuries were reported.
- On April 18, 2008, a Beech twin-engine airplane flying from Tomahawk, Wisconsin, sustained heavy damage when its landing gear retracted while landing. No serious injuries to the pilot and passenger were reported.
- On July 5, 2009, a Cessna single-engine airplane made an emergency landing after circling the airport for 45 minutes due to faulty landing gear. The plane was damaged; the pilot and two passengers were not injured.
- On February 14, 2010, Delta Connection flight 3679 with 35 passengers returned to the airport terminal after a passenger became unruly and tried to exit the plane while taxiing prior to takeoff. The Bombardier CRJ200, en route to Detroit, was delayed for three hours. The passenger was detained by airport police and Federal Bureau of Investigation agents.
- On June 10, 2010, a Transportation Security Administration (TSA) official noticed a deceased person in a vehicle parked in the airport's long term parking lot. The driver, a victim of a suicide, parked the vehicle on February 25 and was not in plain view.
- On November 27, 2012, a Cessna 177RG lost power during takeoff on runway 10R/28L. The plane made an emergency glide landing on the west end of the runway, closing the runway for one hour and canceling a Delta Connection flight from Detroit. The pilot and two passengers were hospitalized with back pain.
- On October 3, 2019, five people were killed and one was critically injured when a small plane crash landed at the airport.
- On August 24, 2021, a single-engine Cirrus Vision SF50 crashed near the airport and was engulfed in flames. All four passengers escaped with no injuries. The incident is currently under investigation.
- On August 15, 2023, an Ameriflight Beech Model 99 crashed after takeoff from Lansing. The sole pilot onboard was not injured. The crash is under investigation.

== Photo gallery ==
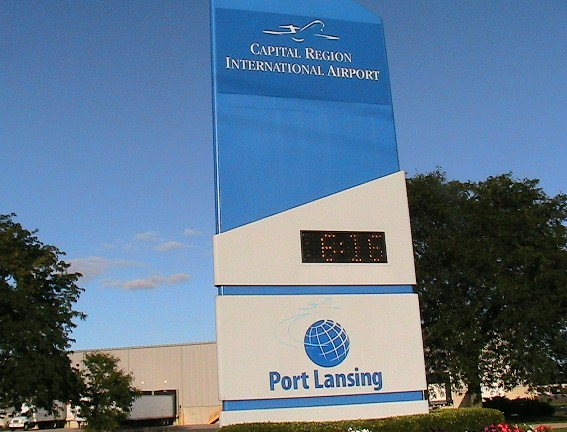
Capital Region International Airport entrance sign from Grand River Ave.

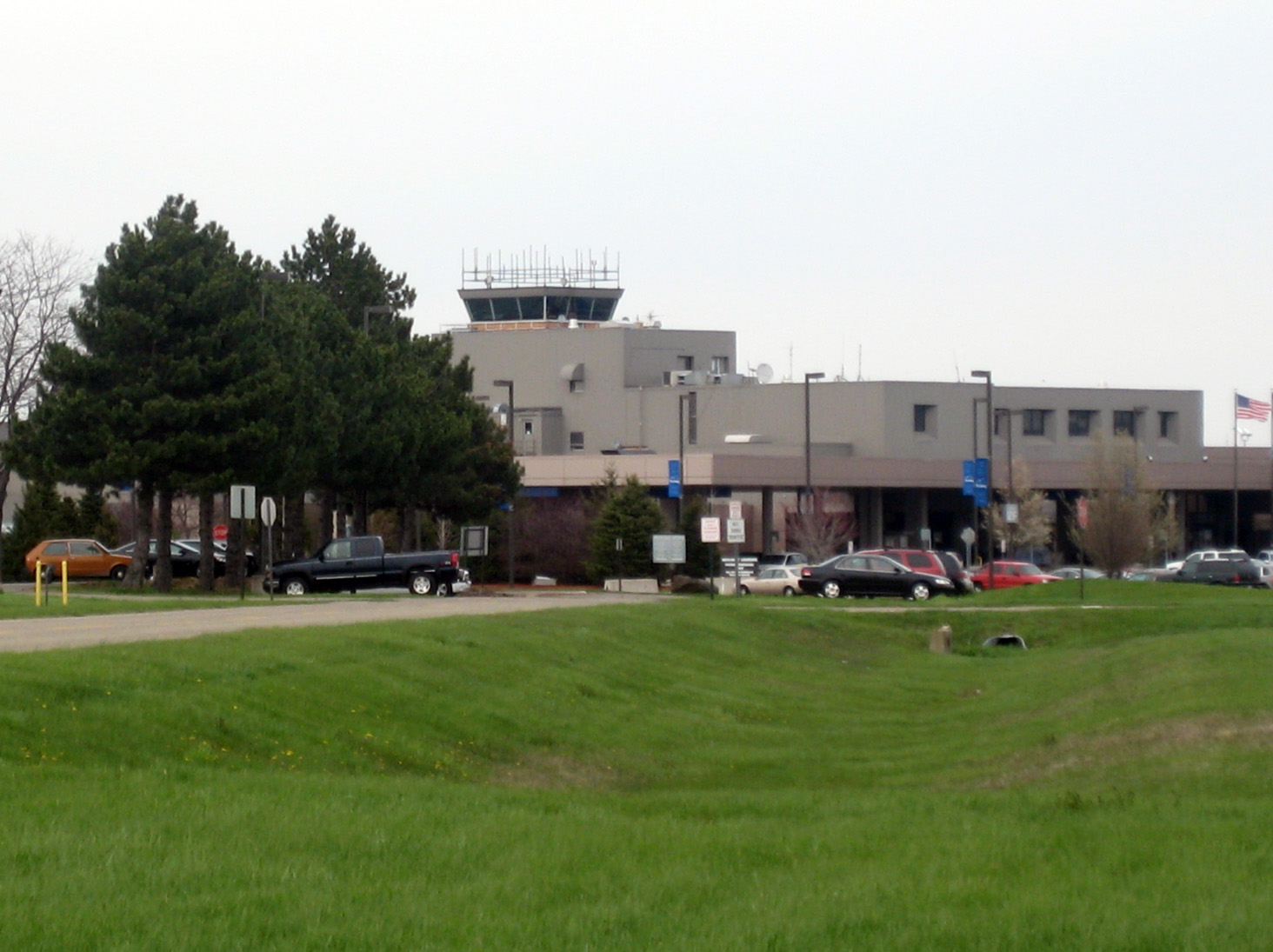
Airport terminal and control tower from Aviation Tech Drive

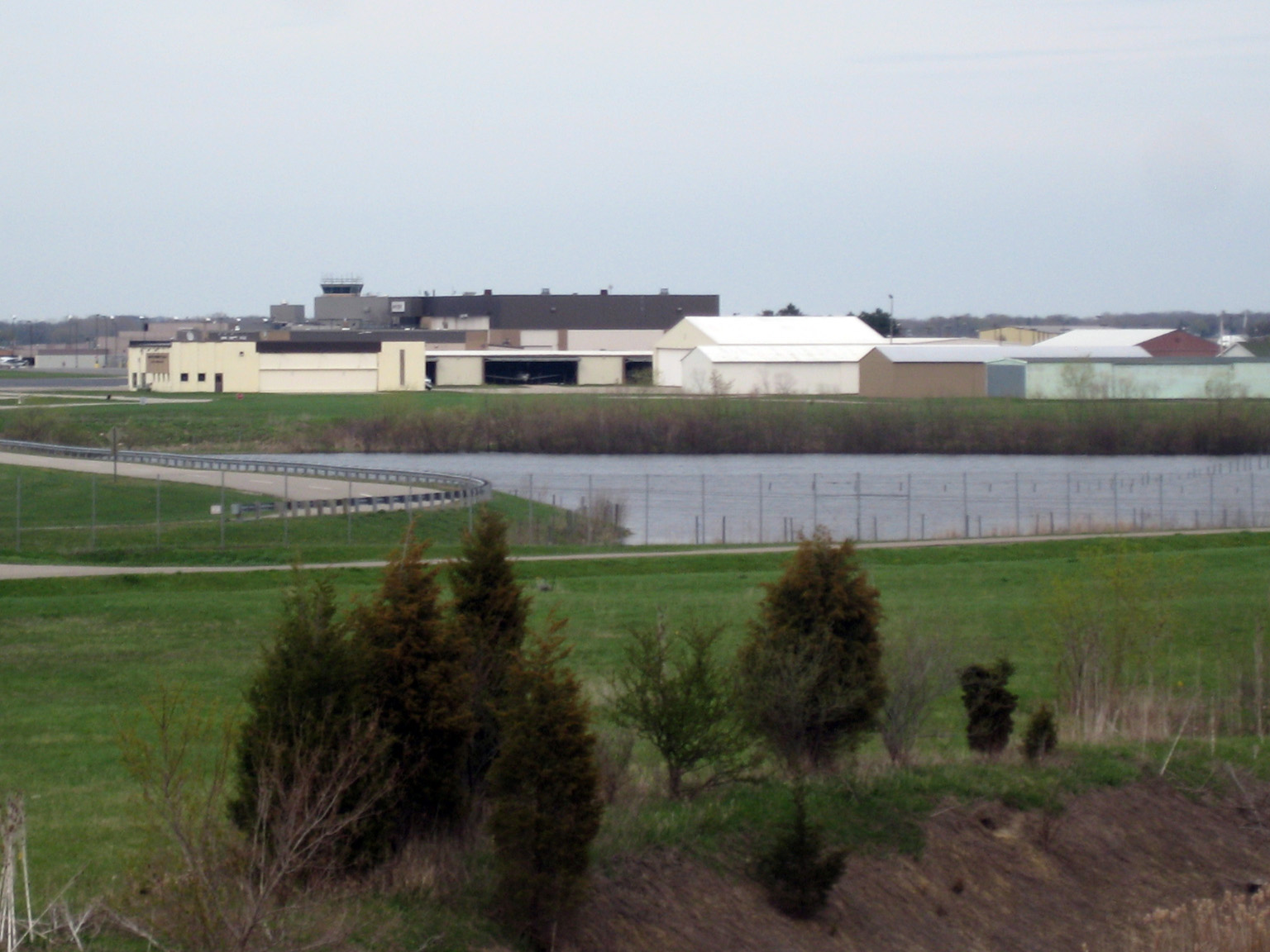
Airport hangars and terminal from Grand River Ave.

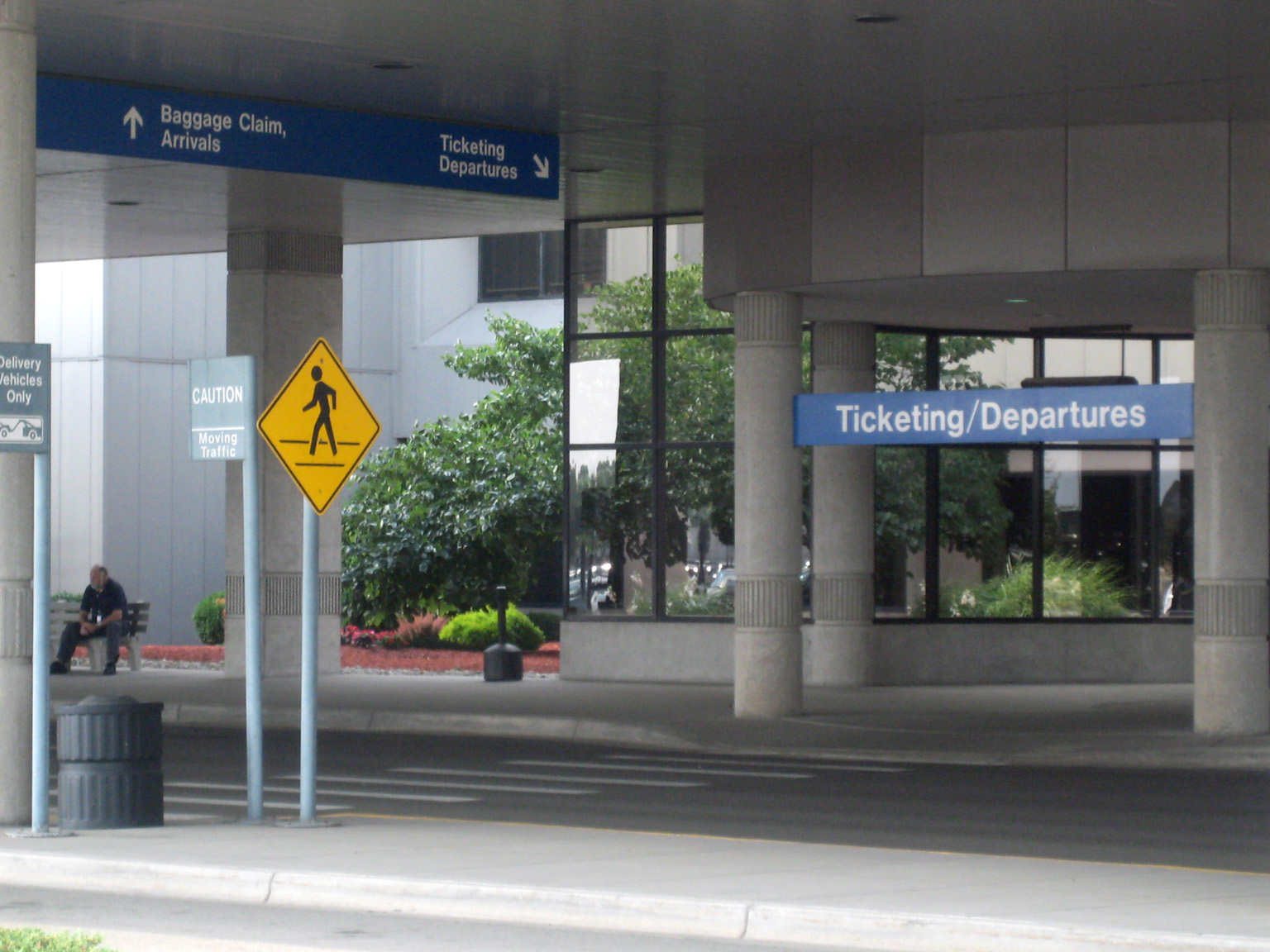
Ticketing/Departures terminal entrance

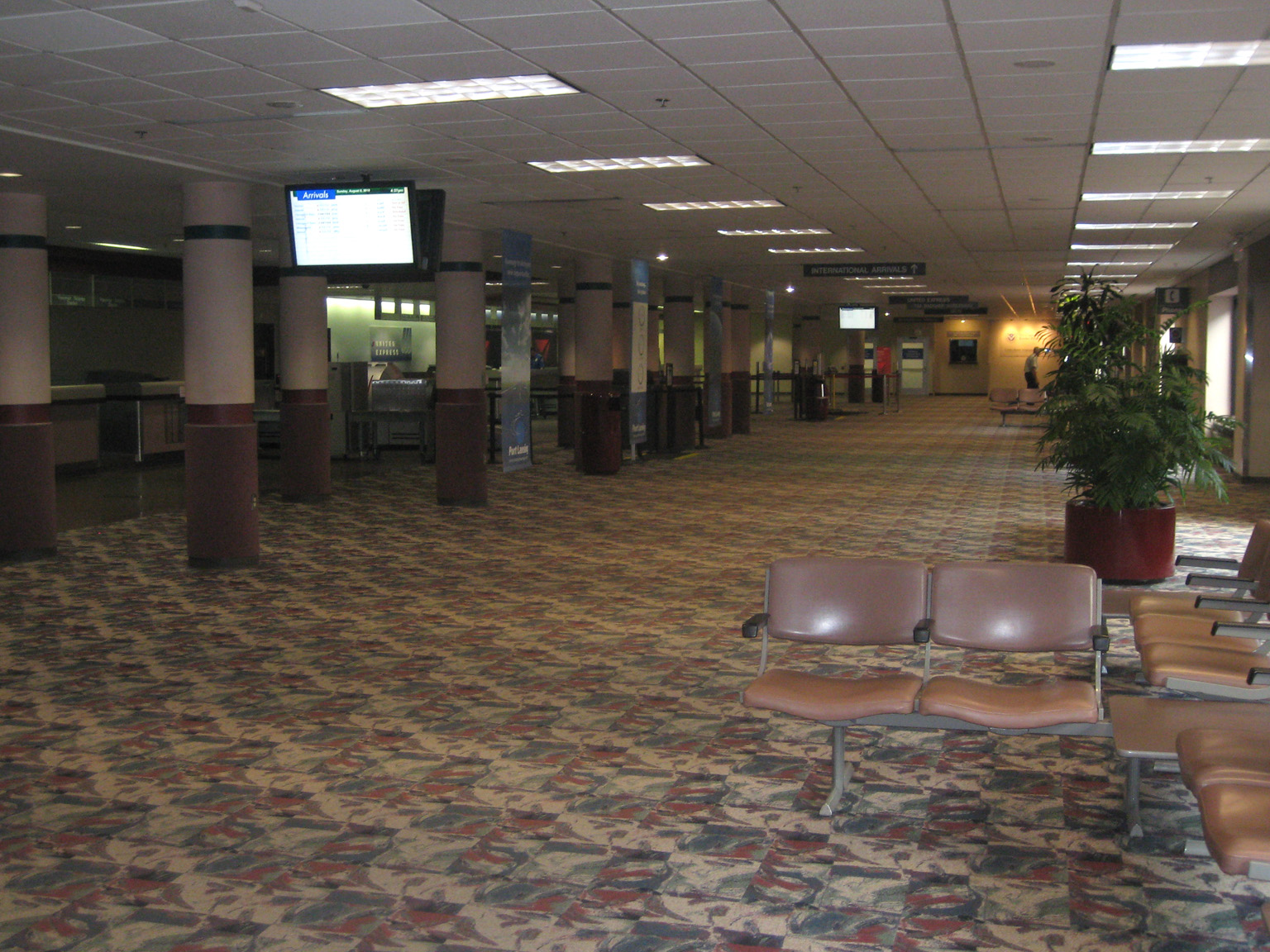
Airline ticketing area in terminal

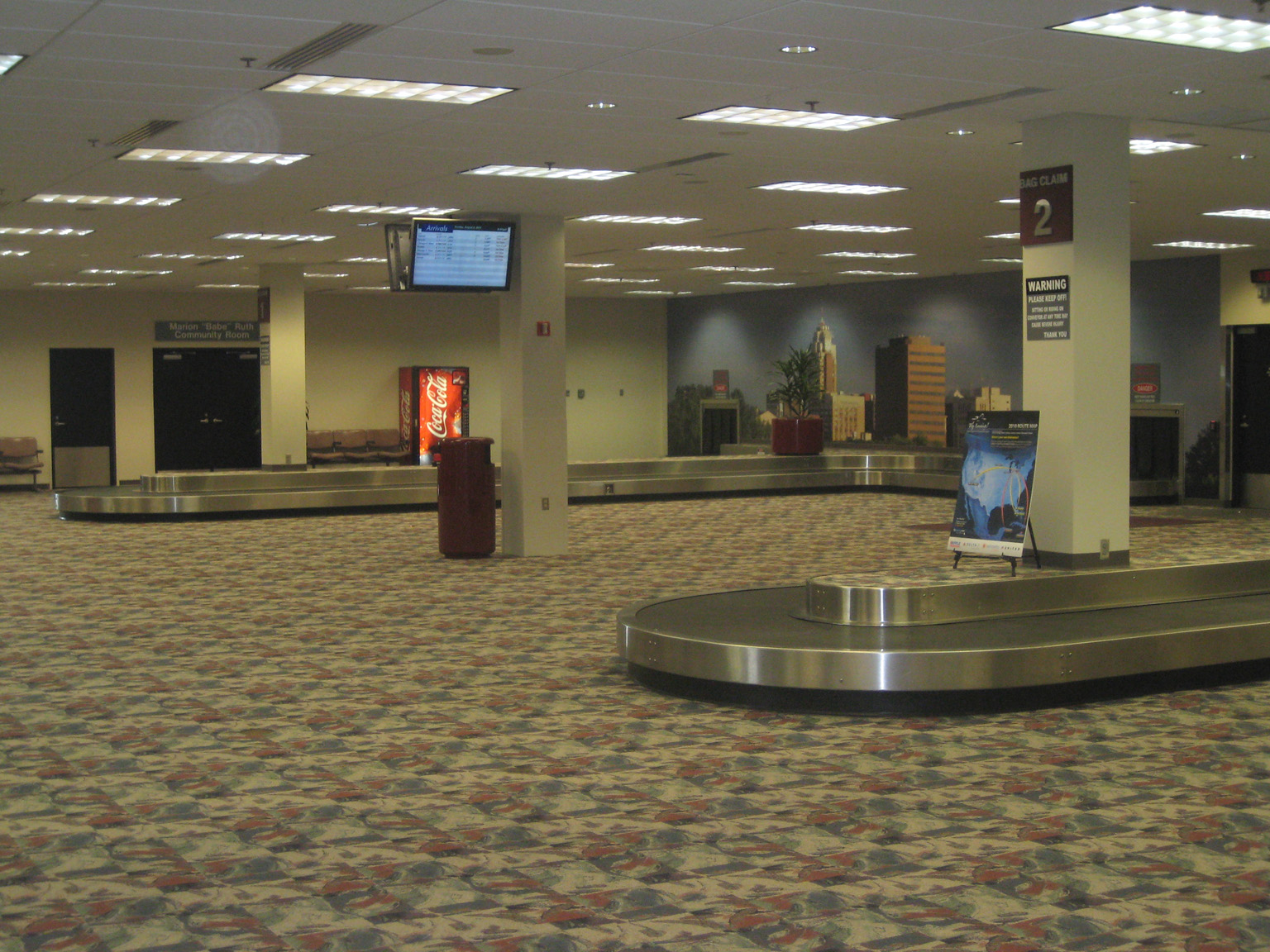
Baggage claim area in terminal

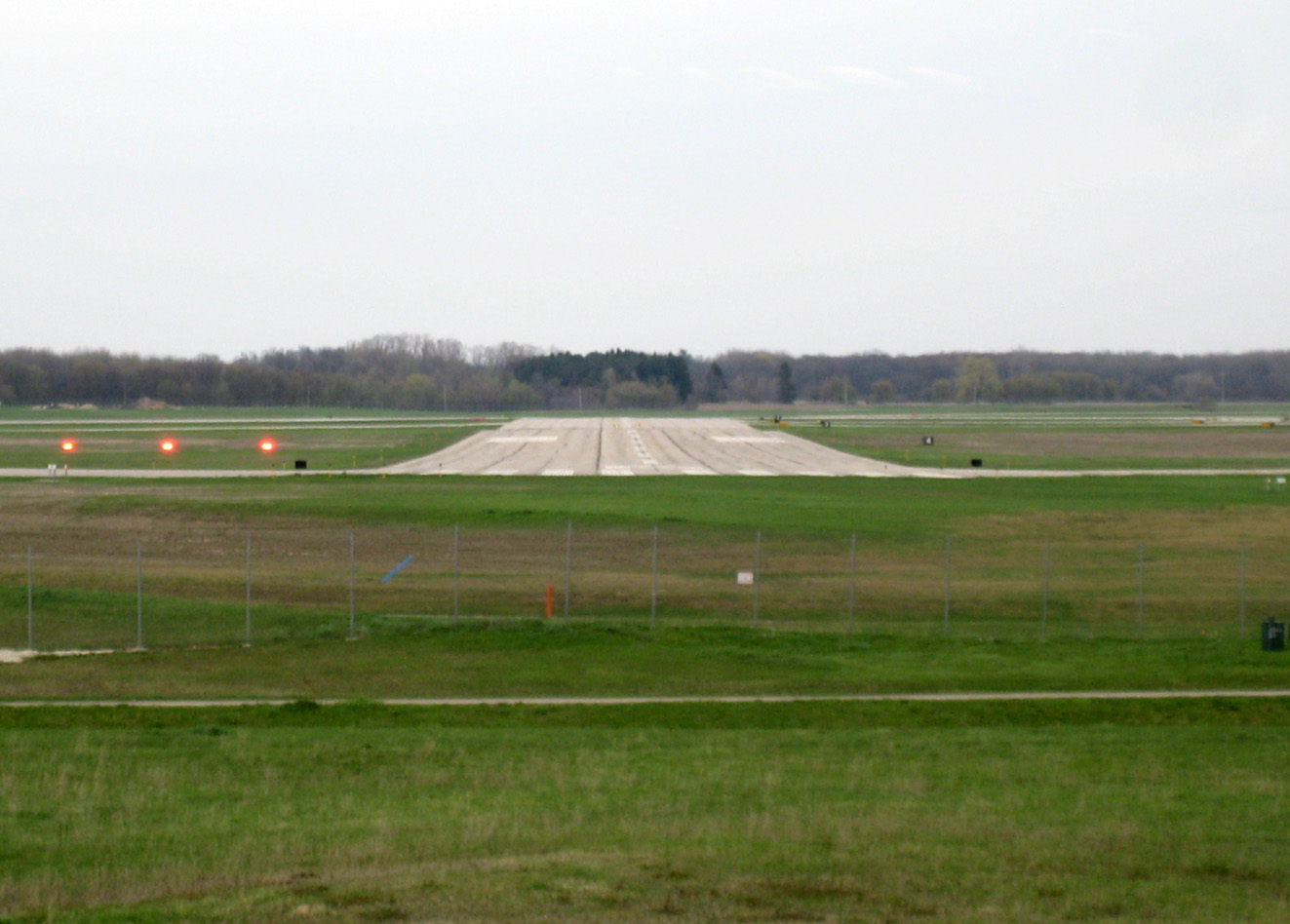
Runway 06/24 from Grand River Ave. facing northeast

== See also ==
- List of airports in Michigan
- Port Lansing
- Port of Entry
- Lansing, Michigan Transportation
- Mason Jewett Field
