= DeWitt Charter Township, Michigan =

DeWitt Township, Michigan
- Charter township
- DeWitt Charter Township
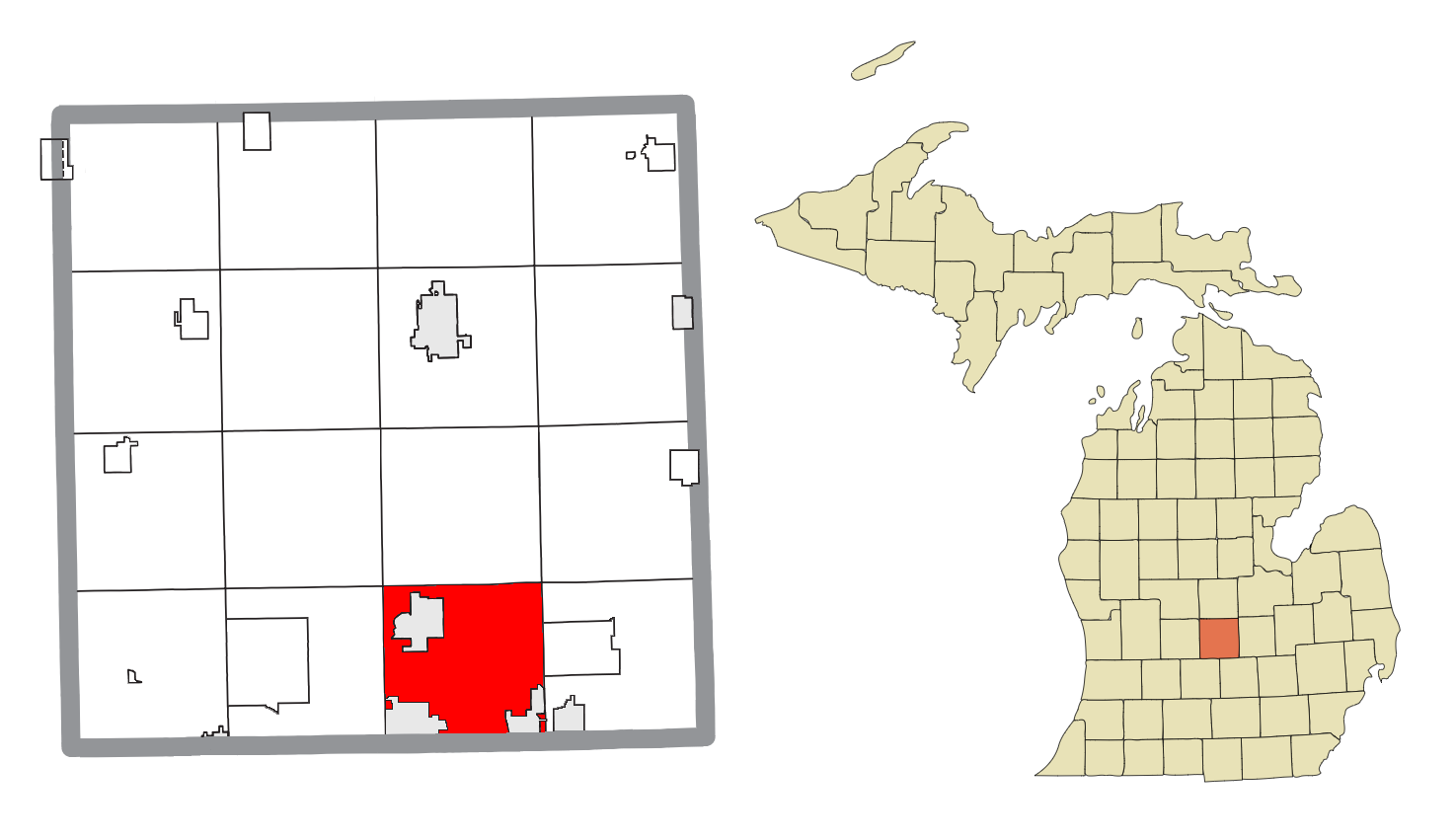
- Location within Clinton County

- Location within the state of Michigan Location within the United States
- Coordinates: 42°48′41″N 84°32′22″W
- Country: United States
- State: Michigan
- County: Clinton
- Established: 1836

Government
  - Supervisor: Richard Galardi
  - Clerk: Adam Cramton

Area
  - Total: 31.27 sq mi (80.99 km^{2})
  - Land: 31.03 sq mi (80.37 km^{2})
  - Water: 0.24 sq mi (0.62 km^{2})
- Elevation: 830 ft (253 m)

Population (2020)
  - Total: 15,073
  - Density: 485.7/sq mi (187.5/km^{2})
- Time zone: UTC-5 (EST)
  - Summer (DST): UTC-4 (EDT)
- ZIP code(s): 48808 (Bath); 48820 (DeWitt); 48906 (Lansing)
- Area code: 517
- FIPS code: 26-22140
- GNIS feature ID: 1626183
- Website: Official website

DeWitt Charter Township is a charter township of Clinton County in the U.S. state of Michigan. The population was 15,073 at the 2020 census, which was an increase from 14,321 at the 2010 census.

The original survey township now includes portions of the cities of DeWitt, East Lansing, and Lansing, but all are administered autonomously or through 425 Agreements.

== Communities ==
- The cities of Lansing and East Lansing are adjacent to the south, and considerable development extends into the township as a result of the proximity to both cities.
- East Lansing entered into 425 Agreements with the township for approximately 1,200 acres (4.9 km^{2}) of the township that were consolidated into a single agreement in 2001. Under the agreement, East Lansing is required to provide services to the land in exchange for 32 percent of the area's property taxes. At the end of the 33-year agreement, the land will be turned over to the city
- The township also entered a 425 Agreement with Bath Township in 2002 for a small portion of the township.
- In 2011 the township entered into another 425 Agreement with Lansing, Michigan for property in the south-west corner of the Township. This 425 was for approximately 2,000 acres (8.1 km^{2}) surrounding and including Capital Region International Airport. This 425 allowed the City of Lansing and DeWitt Township to apply for and receive the Next Michigan Development Zone designation from the State of Michigan to develop an aerotropolis.
- DeWitt Township has three primary school districts: DeWitt, Bath, and Lansing. Some parcels are in the St. Johns and East Lansing School Districts.

== Description and history ==
The township is situated directly north of the city of Lansing, Michigan's capital city. One of the fastest growing areas in the state, the township is quickly developing along the Business US 127 thoroughfare, and near its intersection with I-69. The township is also home to Lansing Capital Region International Airport.

DeWitt was named after DeWitt Clinton, Governor of New York from 1817 to 1822, and again from 1825 until his death in 1828. It was first settled by Captain David Scott, who moved there from Ann Arbor in 1833, and platted the land. The State Legislature formally created DeWitt Township on March 23, 1836. The first township meeting was held at the house of Captain Scott on April 8, 1836. A gentleman by the name of Welcome J. Partelo was named the township's first Supervisor at that meeting.

It did not take long for the State to divide DeWitt Township into the many townships that we recognize today. In 1837, the township was split in half by a north–south line with the western half becoming Watertown Township. Two years later, the township was again split in half by an East–west line with the northern half becoming Bingham Township. One day later, the Governor approved an act, which split the remaining township area in half by a north–south line with the eastern half becoming Ossowa Township (renamed Bath Township in 1843). The final split of the township came in 1841 with the northern half of the remaining land becoming Olive Township. In four years, DeWitt Township went from encompassing the entire County to its current boundary.

The county seat for Clinton County was also located in DeWitt Township from the inception of the county. The county seat remained in DeWitt Township until December 1857 when it was moved to Plumstead Hall, in the village of St. Johns, until a new courthouse could be built.

In the early 1900s, the Lansing, St. Johns and St. Louis Railway opened the community to a new era of prosperity.

It was not until 1929 when the town was incorporated as a village, and then was no longer under the full jurisdiction of the township.[3]

The Village of DeWitt was incorporated into a city in 1965.

The Township became a Charter Township on November 7, 1978.

The DeWitt area was ranked as the 75th best place to live in the United States by CNN Money in 2005.[4]

DeWitt Township has three primary schools district; DeWitt Public Schools, Bath Public Schools and Lansing Public Schools.

The DeWitt area is the home of gymnast Jordyn Wieber, who was part of the gold medal-winning women's gymnastics team at the 2012 London Summer Olympics.

== Geography ==
According to the United States Census Bureau, the township has a total area of 31.27 square miles (80.99 km^{2}), of which 31.03 square miles (80.37 km^{2}) is land and 0.24 square miles (0.62 km^{2}) (0.77%) is water.

== Demographics ==
Historical population
| Census | Pop. | Note | %± |
|---|---|---|---|
| 1960 | 7,649 | | — |
| 1970 | 9,909 | | 29.5% |
| 1980 | 10,038 | | 1.3% |
| 1990 | 10,448 | | 4.1% |
| 2000 | 12,143 | | 16.2% |
| 2010 | 14,321 | | 17.9% |
| 2020 | 15,073 | | 5.3% |
| 2021 (est.) | 15,323 | | 1.7% |
U.S. Decennial Census

As of the census of 2000, there were 12,143 people, 4,839 households, and 3,450 families residing in the township. The population density was 383.5 inhabitants per square mile (148.1/km^{2}). There were 5,119 housing units at an average density of 161.7 per square mile (62.4/km^{2}). The racial makeup of the township was 94.16% White, 1.34% African American, 0.81% Native American, 0.86% Asian, 0.02% Pacific Islander, 1.22% from other races, and 1.58% from two or more races. Hispanic or Latino of any race were 4.02% of the population.

There were 4,839 households, out of which 32.1% had children under the age of 18 living with them, 58.4% were married couples living together, 9.1% had a female householder with no husband present, and 28.7% were non-families. 23.5% of all households were made up of individuals, and 7.2% had someone living alone who was 65 years of age or older. The average household size was 2.49 and the average family size was 2.94.

In the township the population was spread out, with 25.0% under the age of 18, 6.9% from 18 to 24, 29.5% from 25 to 44, 26.2% from 45 to 64, and 12.5% who were 65 years of age or older. The median age was 38 years. For every 100 females, there were 96.4 males. For every 100 females age 18 and over, there were 93.8 males.

The median income for a household in the township was $49,782, and the median income for a family was $61,202. Males had a median income of $45,013 versus $36,297 for females. The per capita income for the township was $24,624. About 3.2% of families and 5.4% of the population were below the poverty line, including 6.3% of those under age 18 and 5.7% of those age 65 or over.
