= Mason Jewett Field =

Public use airport in Mason, Michigan

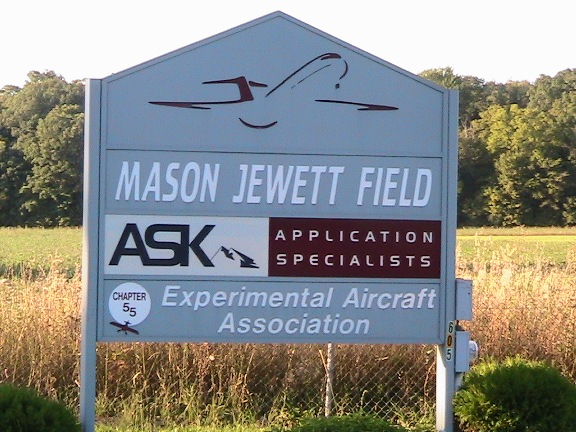
- IATA: none; ICAO: KTEW; FAA LID: TEW

Summary
- Airport type: Public
- Owner/Operator: Capital Region Airport Authority
- Serves: Mason, Michigan
- Time zone: UTC−05:00 (-5)
  - Summer (DST): UTC−04:00 (-4)
- Elevation AMSL: 920 ft (280 m)
- Coordinates: 42°33′57″N 084°25′24″W
- Website: www.flylansing.com/...

Map
- Location of airport in Michigan TEW (the United States)

Runways
Direction	Length		Surface
Direction	ft	m	Surface
10/28	4,004	1,220	Asphalt

Statistics (2020)
- Aircraft operations: 6500
- Based aircraft: 83
- Source: Federal Aviation Administration

Mason Jewett Field (ICAO: KTEW, FAA LID: TEW) is a public use airport located one nautical mile (1.85 km) southeast of the central business district of Mason, in Ingham County, Michigan, United States. It is owned and operated by the Capital Region Airport Authority, which also oversees the nearby Capital Region International Airport (LAN) in Lansing, Michigan.

It is included in the Federal Aviation Administration (FAA) National Plan of Integrated Airport Systems for 2017–2021, in which it is categorized as a local general aviation facility. Although many U.S. airports use the same three-letter location identifier for the FAA and IATA, this airport is assigned TEW by the FAA and has no designation from the IATA.

The airport is home to a chapter of the Experimental Aircraft Association.

== History ==
=== 1940s-1960s ===
Mason mayor Arthur W. Jewett believed that the popularity of aviation during World War II, and the return of veterans to the area, would make an airport an increasingly important asset to the community. Further, the airport could promote industrial development around Mason. On December 16, 1943, Jewett purchased the 180 acres (73 ha) Elsworth Farm southeast of Mason.

In early 1944, runway 9/27 was constructed at 2,800 feet (853 m) with a turf surface. An existing hip roof barn at the west end of the airfield was converted into an airplane hangar capable of holding three or four planes. A hangar with room for six planes, was built at the northwest end of the airport. A Civil Air Patrol Squadron plane from Lansing was the first to land on the new runway. In October 1944, Stanley Keck became the first operator of the new Jewett Flying School. A 2,500 feet (762 m) north–south runway was completed at the east end of the existing runway.

An increase of privately owned aircraft based at the airport prompted the construction of five tee hangars along Eden Road in mid-1946. The Sycamore Valley Flyers flying club operated at the airport from 1946 to 1966. In 1948, Laylin Jewett established an aircraft maintenance facility at Jewett Field. In the fall of 1949, lights were installed on runway 9/27. A model airplane hobby shop opened at the airport in the winter of 1949.

By 1950, there were more than 30 planes based at the airport. In September 1950, the airport owner, Arthur Jewett, decided to close the airport. By the mid-1950s, Jewett reopened the airport with Bartlett Smith as Assistant Airport Manager. Harold Manville operated a flight training and aircraft rental business at the airport from 1968 to 1974.

=== 1970s to present ===
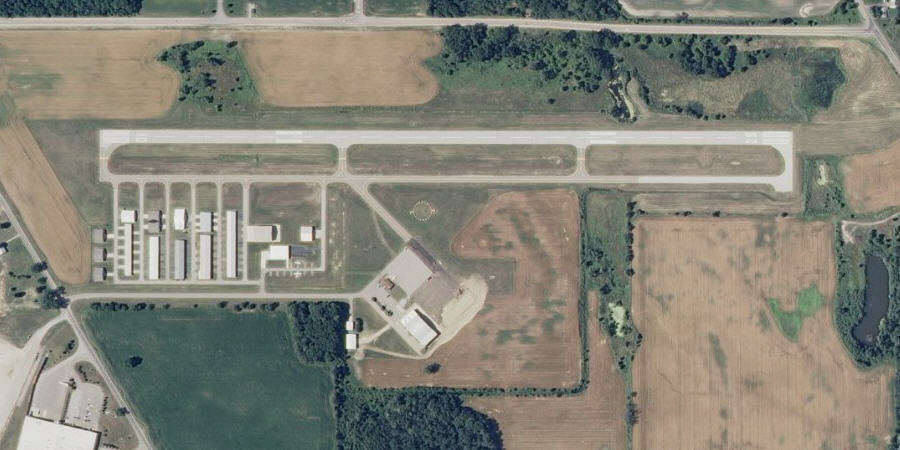
An April 2007 USGS aerial photograph of Mason Jewett Field

In October 1973, a two-year disagreement over a lease on the airport was settled between Arthur Jewett and the airport's operator, Harold Manville. In November, the Michigan Aeronautics Commission granted a license to Arthur Jewett, allowing the facility to remain in operation. By 1973, Jewett reported losing $150,000 in operating the airport.

In March 1977, the Capital Region Airport Authority purchased the 180 acres (73 ha) of airport property from Arthur Jewett as a reliever airfield for Capital City Airport (now Capital Region International Airport) in Lansing. The existing buildings at the airport were removed and a new 3,000 feet (914 m) asphalt runway 9/27 was constructed. The north–south runway was decommissioned and a new terminal was built on its location. During the next decade, the Capital Region Airport Authority purchased approximately 100 acres (40 ha) of adjoining property, allowing the runway to be lengthened to 4,000 feet (1,220 m). A lighted parallel taxiway was also constructed.

The Experimental Aircraft Association, Chapter 55, moved to Jewett Field in 1984. The Association built the airport's Chapter Hangar in 1985, which provides space for members' aircraft, a workshop, and a meeting room.

In 1998, Jewett Field operator AeroGenesis Aviation built a maintenance hangar and office building at the airport.

In June 2009, Lansing Community College signed a five-year lease for a hangar at Jewett Field to house the college's aviation mechanics program. The program is based out of nearby Capital Region International Airport, with potential displacement due to that airport's expansion plans. By February 2010, the June 2009 lease was under litigation. In February 2011, the hangar was purchased by Lansing Community College. In May, the college announced that it would move its aviation mechanics program from Capital Region International Airport to the Jewett Field hangar.

=== Aviation Days ===
Aviation Days is an annual event at Jewett Field that showcases vintage aircraft, including homemade planes, antique passenger planes, and World War II-era military aircraft. The event is organized by the Experimental Aircraft Association, Chapter 55, in Mason.

== Facilities and aircraft ==
Mason Jewett Field covers an area of 275 acres (111 ha) at an elevation of 920 feet (280 m) above mean sea level. It has one runway designated 10/28 with an asphalt surface measuring 4,004 by 75 feet (1,220 x 23 m). The airport is staffed Monday through Friday from 7AM until 4PM. Currently Jewett Field has hangar space for more than 80 airplanes.

The aircraft has a fixed-base operator that offers avgas.

For the 12-month period ending December 31, 2020, the airport had 6500 aircraft operations, an average of 125 per week, all general aviation. This is a decrease from roughly 10,000 operations in 2010; 17,822 in 2009; and 20,960 in 2008. In 2020, there were 83 aircraft based at this airport (an increase from 64 aircraft in 2009): 71 single-engine and 8 multi-engine airplanes, 2 helicopters, 1 jet airplane, and 1 ultralight.

=== Transit ===
- The closest freeway is US-127, which is approximately 0.75 miles (1.2 km) west of Jewett Field. The airport is accessible by road by taking US-127 exit 64 (Kipp Road) east to Eden Road. State highway M-36 is approximately 0.5 miles (0.8 km) north of the airport.
- The Capital Area Transportation Authority (CATA) provides bus service from Lansing to Mason. Route 46 runs weekdays from downtown Lansing to the southside of Mason, near the airport. The Mason Connector runs weekdays and Saturday from south Lansing to Mason.

== Incidents and accidents ==
- On July 26, 2006, a Beechcraft A36 Bonanza crashed during climbout from Mason Field. The pilot reported preflight and takeoff were normal, but the airplane hesitated and stopped climbing 150 feet above the ground. The plane climbed slowly for a moment then started a descent. Airspeed dropped, the stall horn sounded, and the airplane buffeted; the pilot lowered the nose to gain airspeed and banked to avoid obstacles, but the wing impacted an antenna and the landing gear impacted two cars and a parking lot. The plane came to rest and the occupants escaped before the aircraft was consumed by fire. The probable cause was found to be the pilot's failure to maintain adequate airspeed which resulted in a stall/mush on takeoff.
- On May 8, 2007, an Aeronca 7AC ground looped upon landing at Mason County. The pilot stated that the landing was good, but when he reached to turn off the carb heat, the airplane turned to the left. He over-controlled with right rudder and attempted to abort the landing by adding power. He became airborne, stalled, and clipped a tree, causing the airplane to impact terrain. The probable cause was found to be the pilot's failure to maintain directional control during the landing roll and failure to maintain sufficient airspeed during the aborted landing attempt, leading to an inadvertent stall.
- On September 17, 2010, a Tecnam P2004 Bravo single-engine plane lost power and crashed in a field north of the airport shortly after takeoff, crushing the nose of the plane. The pilot was hospitalized.
- On September 1, 2022, a Dassault Falcon business jet (N123RA) diverted from Capital Region International Airport (KLAN) due to engine issues and ran off the end of the runway into the grass.

== Photo gallery ==
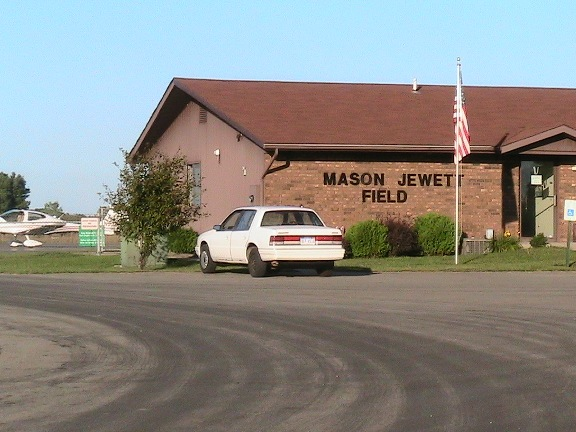
Jewett Field terminal building in Mason, MI

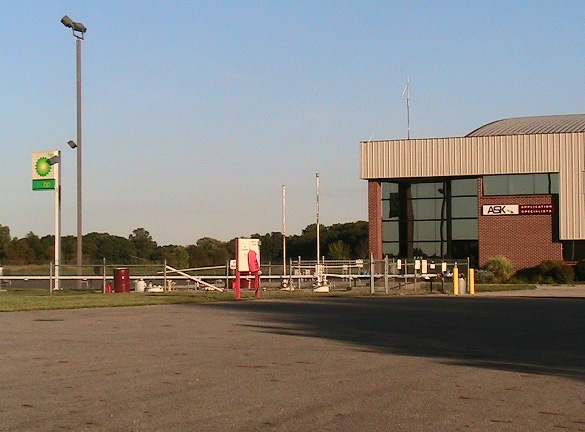
Airport fueling center from parking lot

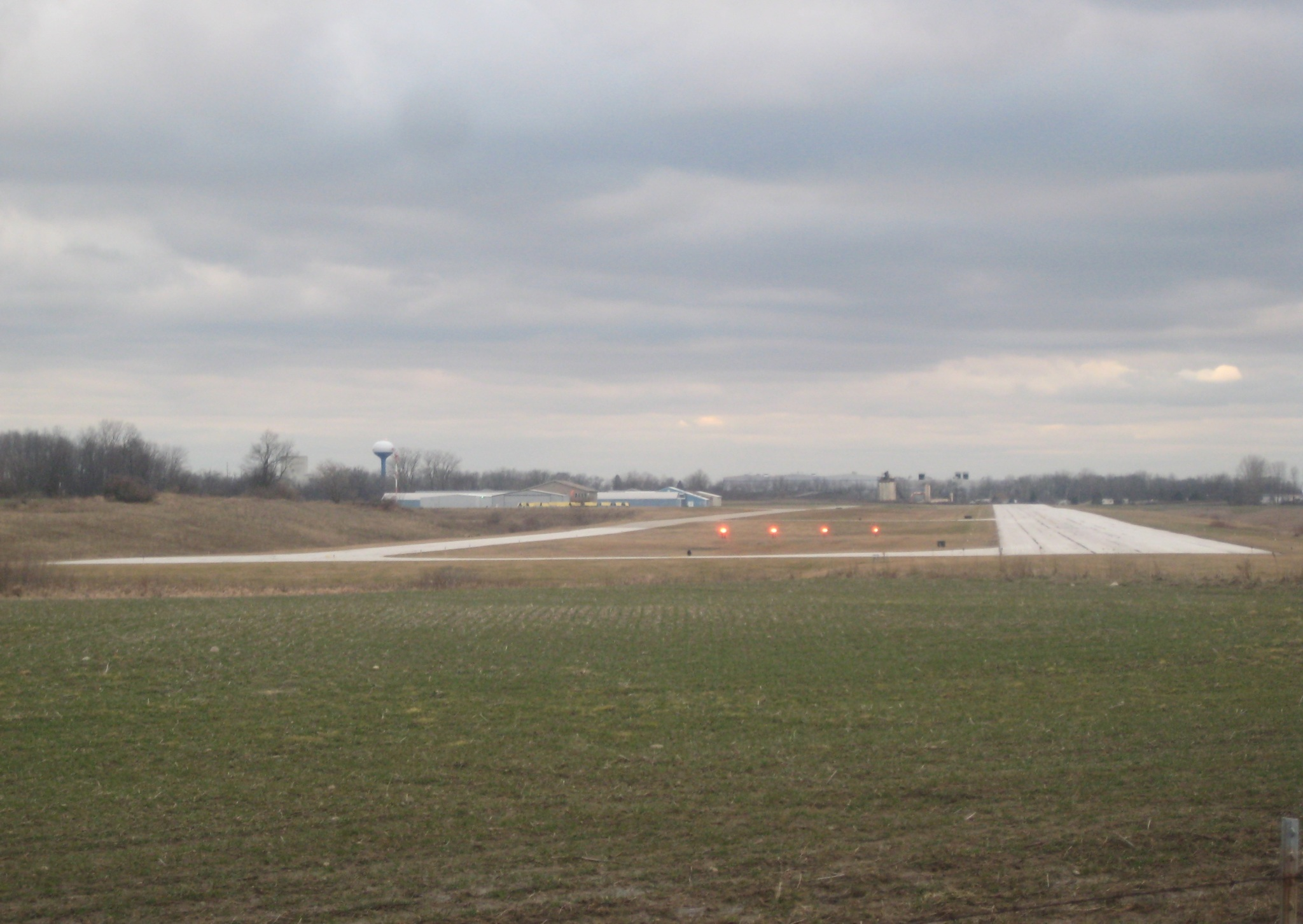
Runway 10/28 from West Dexter Trail

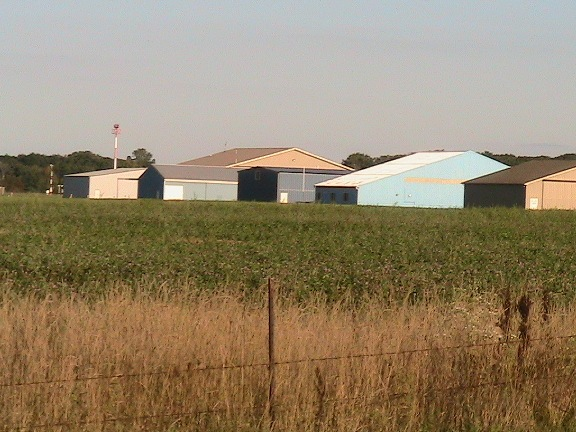
Jewett Field hangars from Eden Road

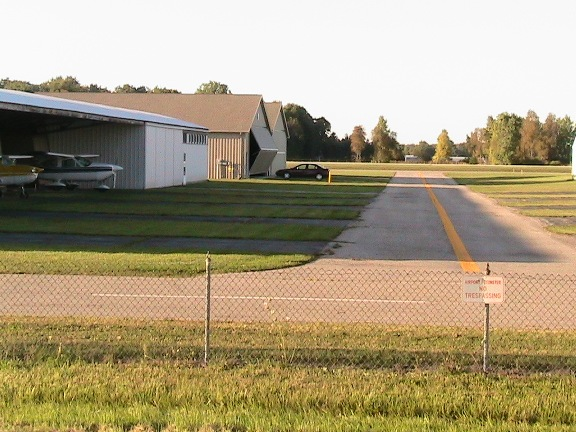
Airplane hangars from Jewett Airport Road

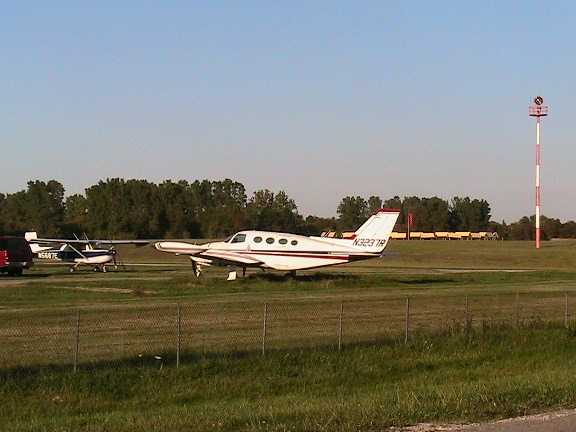
Taxiway and airplanes from Jewett Airport Road

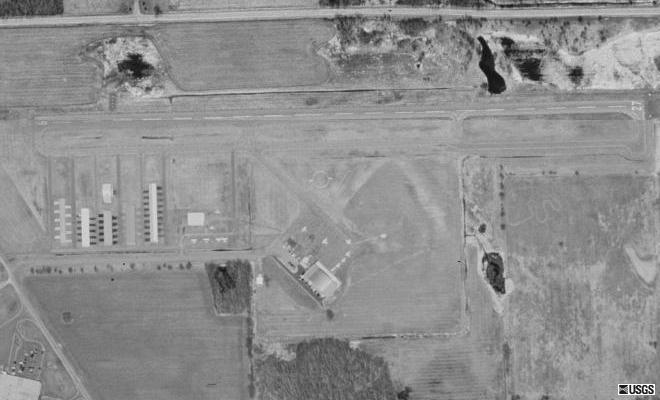
April 1999 USGS aerial photograph of Jewett Field

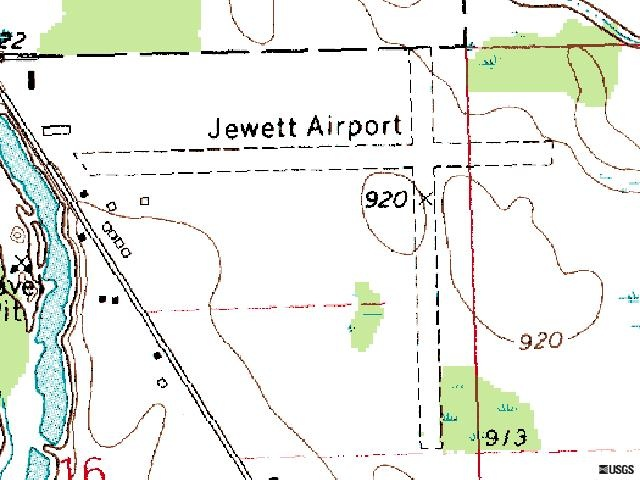
July 1976 USGS topographic map of Jewett Field

== See also ==
- List of airports in Michigan
- Capital Region Airport Authority
- Capital Region International Airport
