= University Airpark =

- IATA: none; ICAO: none; FAA LID: 41G

Summary
- Airport type: Public
- Operator: Robert Alleva
- Serves: Bath, Michigan
- Location: Bath Township, Michigan
- Elevation AMSL: 856 ft / 261 m
- Coordinates: 42°50′25.120″N 84°28′44.92″W
- Interactive map of University Airpark

Runways
Direction	Length		Surface
Direction	ft	m	Surface
8/26	1,994	608	Turf

Statistics (2021)
- Aircraft operations: 400
- Based aircraft: 4
- Source: Federal Aviation Administration

University Airpark (ICAO: K41G, FAA LID: 41G) is a privately owned, public-use general aviation airport located 2 miles (3 km) west-northwest of Bath, Michigan in Clinton County, Michigan, United States. Lansing Capital Region International Airport is located 6 miles (10 km) southwest.

== Facilities ==
University Airport covers an area of 20 acres (8.1 ha) at an elevation of 856 feet (261 m) above mean sea level. The airport has one runway, designated as runway 8/26, which measures 1994 x 100 ft (608 x 30 m). It is attended intermittently.

No fuel is available at the airport.

For the 12-month period ending December 31, 2021, the airport had 400 general aviation aircraft operations, an average of 33 per month (a decrease from 639 operations in 2005). At that time there were 5 aircraft based at this airport: 4 single-engine airplanes, and 1 helicopter.

=== Transit ===
The airport is accessible by road from Howe Road, and is located near the corner of Howe Road and Chandler Road.

== See also ==
- List of airports in Michigan
