= Charter township =

Township with village-like powers in Michigan

A charter township is a form of local government in the U.S. state of Michigan. While all townships in Michigan are organized governments, a charter township has been granted a charter, which allows it certain rights and responsibilities of home rule that are generally intermediate between those of a city (a semi-autonomous jurisdiction in Michigan) and a village. Unless it is a home-rule village, a village is subject to the authority of any township in which it is located.

Of Michigan's 1,240 townships, 143 are charter townships. A number of charter townships are among the most populous municipalities in Michigan. For example, Clinton Township and Canton Township, both in Metro Detroit, were respectively the 8th and 9th most populous municipalities in Michigan at the 2020 census. The most recent township to become a charter township is Brady Township in Kalamazoo County, which adopted charter status on January 3, 2024.

== History ==
Following World War II, suburbanization increased the population in many formerly outlying communities. In 1947, the state legislature created a special charter township status, which grants additional powers and streamlined administration in order to provide greater protection for townships against annexation of land by cities and villages. As of 2024, there were 139 charter townships in Michigan. A township with a population of 2,000 or more may incorporate as a charter township and become a municipal corporation. It possesses all the powers of a non-charter township, in addition to those specified by the Charter Township Act of 1947.

The first township to incorporate as a charter township was Battle Creek Charter Township in Calhoun County, which adopted the charter form of government in February 1948. Battle Creek Charter Township voters reverted the township's form of government to a civil township in 1952, and the township was consolidated into the City of Battle Creek in 1983.

== Government ==
Legislative authority is exercised by an elected township board of seven members, consisting of the supervisor, township clerk, township treasurer, and four trustees. They must be residents of the township and eligible to vote in elections. All members of the board serve four-year terms. Unlike the boards for general law townships, which may have either five or seven members, a charter township must have seven members. If a general law township with a five-member board elects to become a charter township, two additional members are to be elected in the next general election.

Charter townships may appoint either a township superintendent or township manager, who can be assigned responsibilities for managing township functions. (This is comparable to cities that hire a city manager to oversee the day-to-day operations of the city). Otherwise, executive authority lies with the supervisor and various committees.

== Privileges ==
A charter township may establish a variety of municipal services, such as a police force, fire department, and assessors, and may also acquire property. It may borrow money and issue bonds, with the approval of a majority of township voters in an election. Similarly, a charter township cannot levy taxes without the approval of a majority of the township population voting in an election. This is one significant difference from home-rule municipalities, in which the municipal authority can levy taxes without specific approval from voters.

== Requirements ==
A charter township is mostly exempt from annexation from contiguous cities or villages, providing that the township meets certain requirements:

- Has state equalized valuation of at least $25,000,000
- Has a minimum population density of 150 people per square mile (58/km^{2})
- Provides fire protection service by contract or otherwise
- Is governed by a comprehensive zoning ordinance or master plan
- Provides solid waste disposal services to township residents, within or without the township, by contract, license, or municipal ownership
- Provides water or sewer services, or both, by contract or otherwise
- Provides police protection through contract with the sheriff in addition to normal sheriff patrol, through an intergovernmental contract, or through its own police department

== Annexation and 425 Agreements ==
A charter township may still be subject to annexation under certain conditions, such as for the purpose of eliminating isolated islands of township or by vote of a majority of the residents of a portion of township. Temporary land transfers, which can involve charter townships, have provision under Public Act 425 of 1984. Under this statute, a charter township, for example, can have land transferred to a city in exchange for revenue sharing of the transferred parcels. These agreements, known as 425 Agreements, can last up to 50 years, and the land can either be completely transferred to the city or returned to the township upon fulfillment of the agreement.

== See also ==
- Administrative divisions of Michigan
- Coterminous municipality
- Paper township
