= Cross-docking =

Practice in logistics of unloading directly to customer or other transportation

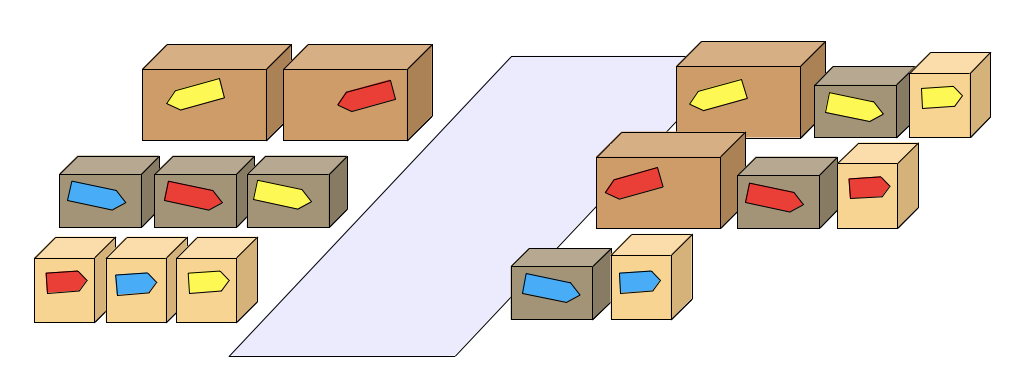
Example of cross-docking: incoming parcels (left) are sorted by label for output (right)

Cross-docking is the logistics process of transhipping inventory in a flow-centre by unloading the shipments from the inbound trucks directly to the outbound trucks to reduce shipment time and cost by eliminating storage and order picking activities, thus accelerating the flow of the shipping cycle. The Material Handling Industry of America defines cross-docking as “the process of moving merchandise from the receiving dock to shipping [dock] for shipping without placing it first into storage locations”. Cross-docking often aims to minimize overheads related to storing goods between shipments or while awaiting a customer's order. This may be done to change the type of conveyance, to sort material intended for different destinations, or to combine material from different origins into transport vehicles (or containers) with the same or similar destinations.

Cross-docking takes place in a distribution docking terminal; usually consisting of trucks and dock doors on two (inbound and outbound) sides with minimal storage space.Industries implement a cross-docking strategy to improve the “just-in-time” deliveries within their supply chain in order to minimize the number of inbound and outbound trucks and enhance sustainability. Under a cross-docking strategy, the inventory is stored only for a short time before being reloaded onto outgoing trucks; the inventory does not stay beyond 24 hours within the cross-dock station.

In the LTL trucking industry, cross-docking is done by moving cargo from one transport vehicle directly onto another, with minimal or no warehousing. In retail practice, cross-docking operations may utilize staging areas where inbound materials are sorted, consolidated, and stored until the outbound shipment is complete and ready to ship.

== History ==
Cross-docking is not a scholar׳s invention: The CD concept appeared as early as the 1980s. This concept emphasizes the transformation of goods at the CD terminals. The CD terminals represent nodes where goods flows are consolidated for final delivery. The CD concept aims to increase the efficiency of goods delivery along the supply chain. It actually finds its roots in industry. Wal-Mart is often cited as the first retailer to implement it, in the late 1980s. In an analysis of Wal-Mart׳s success published in 1992, Stalk et al note that running 85% of its goods through its cross-docks enabled Wal-Mart to lower its costs of sales by 2–3% compared to the industry average in 1992 – and to become the highest profit retailer in the world at that time. Office Depot also achieved major gains with an early adoption of cross-docking techniques, and many other examples of cross-docking implementations can be found in Ertek. Although the CD concept began to be implemented in the 1980s, it did not attract greater attention for further research until later.

Cross-dock operations were pioneered in the US trucking industry in the 1930s, and have been in continuous use in less-than-truckload operations ever since. The US military began using cross-docking operations in the 1950s. Wal-Mart began using cross-docking in the retail sector in the late 1980s.

As of 2014, almost half of all US warehouses are cross-docking.

== Types of cross-docking ==
- Full pallet load operation
- Case-load order makeup
- Hybrid cross-docking
- Opportunistic cross-docking
- Truck/rail consolidation
- Short-term storage

== Principles of Cross-Docking ==
Cross-docking allows e-commerce companies to shorten order processing times and reduce storage costs, which is particularly relevant for platforms that serve thousands of customers daily. One of the most prominent examples of cross-docking in e-commerce is the operations of companies like Alibaba and other large sourcing platforms. Thanks to well-established crossdocking processes, they can quickly process orders and redirect them to regional warehouses or directly to the end consumers. This allows for delivery in the shortest possible time, often within one day, which significantly enhances customer satisfaction.

Complex supply chains between China and the USA require a special approach to logistics due to significant distances, a wide variety of goods, and high demand for timely deliveries. In the supply system between China and the USA, cross-docking plays a key role in optimizing delivery and minimizing storage costs. Unlike traditional warehouses where goods may remain for extended periods, cross-docking allows for the significant reduction or complete elimination of storage stages.

While traditional warehouses are used for long-term storage, cross-docking minimizes or completely eliminates the need for extended storage since goods are reloaded from one vehicle to another in the shortest time possible. This is why cross-docking is widely used today in various industries, especially in retail, e-commerce, and manufacturing. It helps companies maintain low inventory levels, quickly respond to changes in demand, and increase the flexibility of logistics operations.

== Cross-dock facility design ==
Cross-dock facilities are generally designed in an "I" configuration, which is an elongated rectangle. The goal in using this shape is to maximize the number of inbound and outbound doors that can be added to the facility while keeping the floor area inside the facility to a minimum. Bartholdi and Gue (2004) demonstrated that this shape is ideal for facilities with 150 doors or less. For facilities with 150–200 doors, a "T" shape is more cost effective. Finally, for facilities with 200 or more doors, the cost-minimizing shape is an "X".
