= 425 Agreement =

1984 law of the State of Michigan, US

The legislature of the State of Michigan enacted Public Act 425 of 1984 which is also known by the title Intergovernmental Conditional Transfer Of Property By Contract Act. It became effective March 29, 1985, and was subsequently amended in 1998. It is often simply referred to as “Act 425” and contractual agreements entered into pursuant to this statute are frequently called 425 Agreements.

The purpose of Act 425 is to provide for a means for two local units of government to share tax revenues resulting from new or expanding development in the areas of their jurisdiction. Most typically a city and a nearby township are the parties to such an agreement. Because of the limited ability for a city in Michigan to annex adjacent territory, development that takes place outside of the city limits would normally deprive that city of any added revenue benefit. In those cases where the affected township receives its supply of water from the city, the city is given a degree of leverage to negotiate with the township by Act 425.

In the eyes of the Census Bureau, 425 Agreement lands effectively count as annexations, and are included in any calculations of land area and population. The land and population counts toward the party that initiated the agreement.

== Procedure ==
The two units of government proposing to enter into a 425 Agreement negotiate the terms and conditions of the plan. For it to take effect, it must be approved by a majority of the members of the governing body of each respective party. The contract is recorded by the County Clerk and the Secretary of State.

The agreement creates a temporary transfer of jurisdiction for the affected land rather than an outright annexation. The agreement defines the responsibilities that each party has with respect to the affected area. For example, the city as party to such an agreement might have the right to collect city income tax from residents or employees within the transferred area even though they do not actually live or work within the city itself. The township would still retain policing jurisdiction and provide municipal services to the new development.

425 Agreements can be effective for many decades. At the end of the term of the agreement, the agreement itself defines what should happen to the affected land at the termination of the contract. The law permits for the parties to agree for the land to revert to the original party or permanently attached to the other party.

== Issues ==
The concept of 425 Agreements has resulted in some controversy.

=== Proponents ===
The most significant group to benefit from the law is Michigan's cities. Michigan's laws have made it very difficult for a city to expand its boundaries through annexation. Whereas historically a township served a substantially rural and low-density population with a minimal degree of government-provided services, laws were enacted in the middle of the 20th century that significantly favored townships. One such law, peculiar only to Michigan, is the Charter Township Act. By becoming a charter township, the township has additional protection from being annexed by an adjacent city and can provide nearly the same services within its territory that it could if it were a city.

During the last half of the 20th century, most of Michigan's cities experienced a decline in population as many residents moved into developing suburbs. Particularly problematic was the phenomenon of "white flight" whereby more affluent residents who were mainly ethnically white left the cities but certain economically disadvantaged groups remained within the cities. Those who left the cities also took their tax base with them and the governments of these cities were left with having to maintain and support an older infrastructure, housing stock, and economically needy population.

Under Michigan law, only cities can levy an income tax upon their own residents and upon non-residents who work within the city. To compensate in part for the decline in tax revenues as neighboring townships continue to develop, 425 agreements provide for an alternative to annexation and a mutually agreeable plan for sharing revenues between the two units of government. Also, ideally, the concept of 425 Agreements can be integrated into a regional planning concept allowing for several local units of government to coordinate future development.

=== Critics ===
One of the criticisms of the Act 425 provisions is that there is virtually no State oversight in the process. The two local units of government negotiate and approve the agreements on their own and the state merely records the agreement. Also, there is no oversight or review by regional planning organizations or other neighboring cities and townships who are not parties to the agreement yet who might be nevertheless impacted.

The long length of an agreement might not adequately account for changing circumstances during such a rather lengthy period of time. Such a term would exceed the tenure in office of numerous local officials and without a mechanism in place for periodic review, subsequent disagreements, misinterpretation and litigation might result when the intentions of the original proposers of an agreement have been forgotten.

Another possible snag is the matter of what happens to the land at the end of an agreement. If the land is to revert to the township, but if the city had invested significantly towards the development of the infrastructure on the land, the city would lose any interest in its investment. If the agreement provides for the land to be annexed to the city, but it is not contiguous to the existing city boundaries at that time, this would conflict with other provisions of Michigan law which prevent a city from annexing non-contiguous territory.

== See also ==
- Municipal government
- Municipal services
- Township
- Charter Township
- Local Government
- Local Government of the United States
