= East Lansing, Michigan =

City in Michigan, U.S.

- City
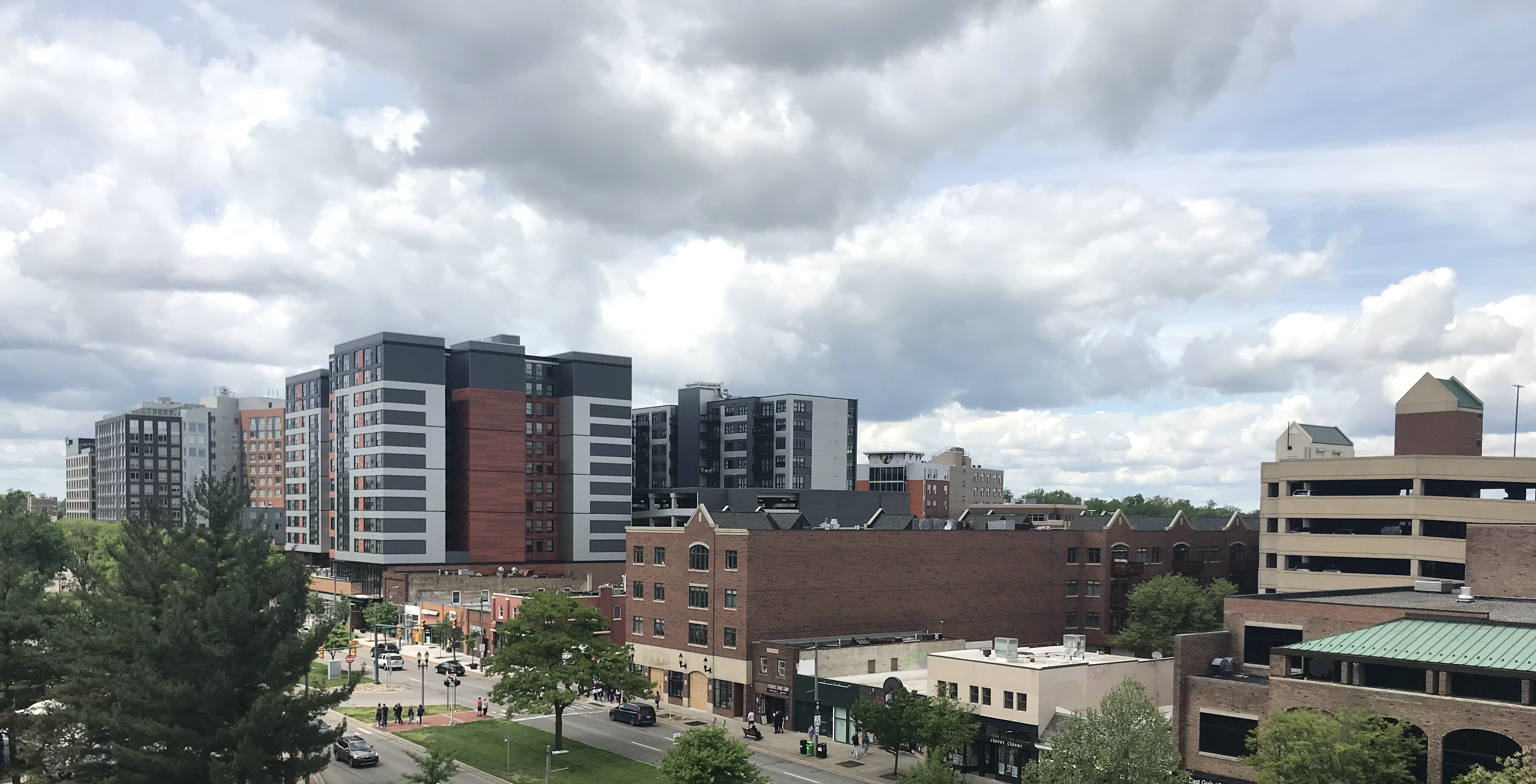
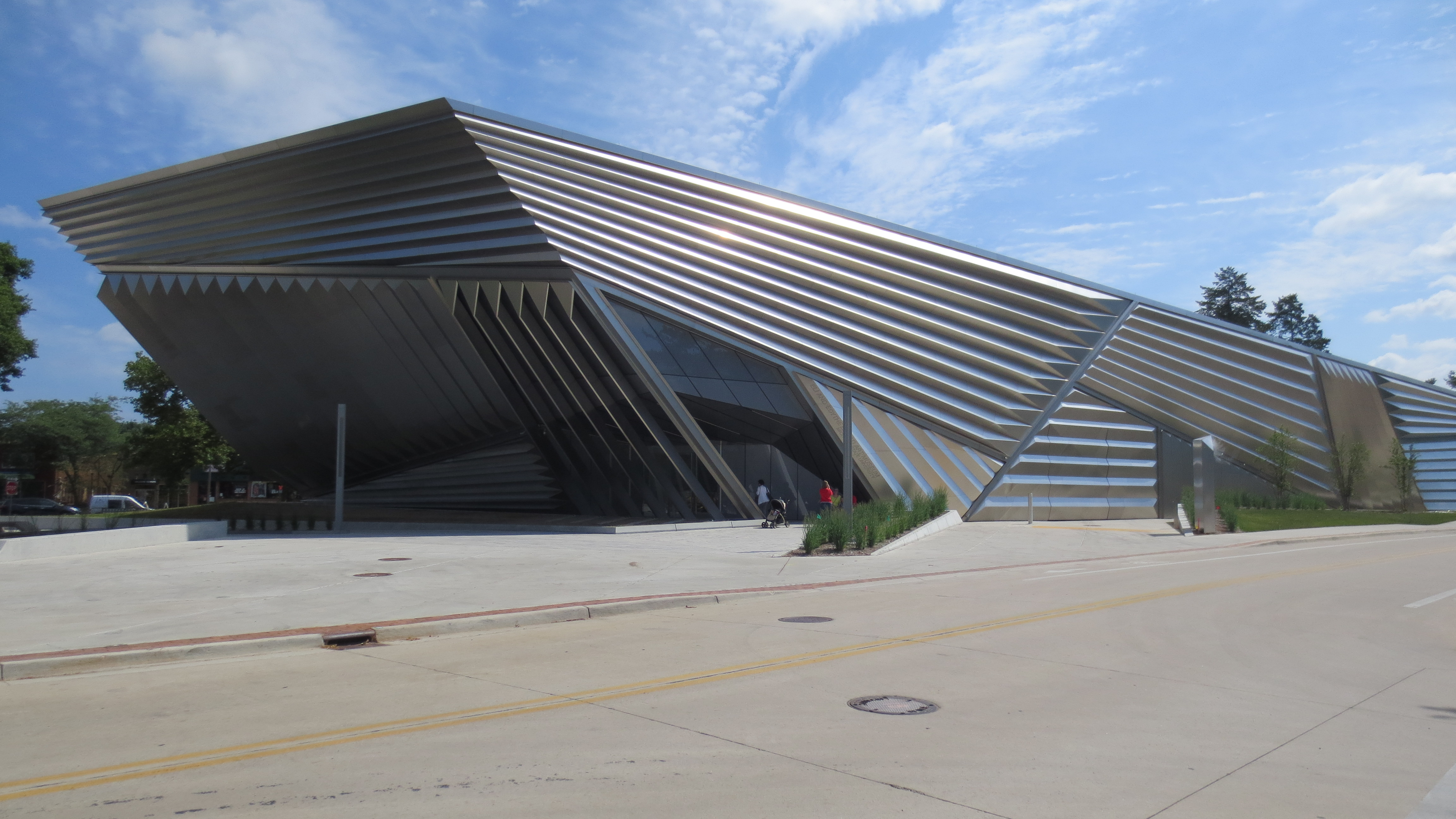
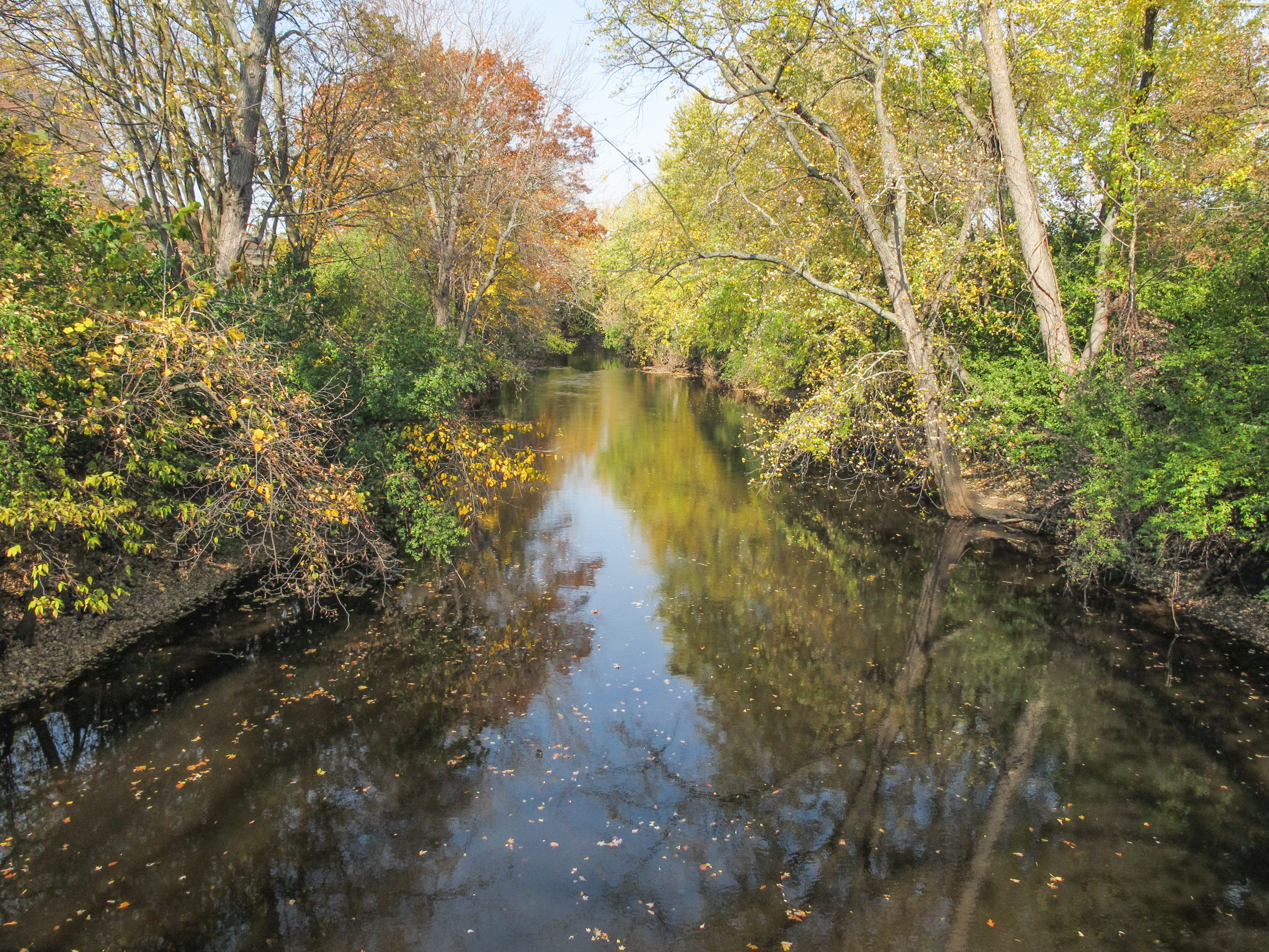
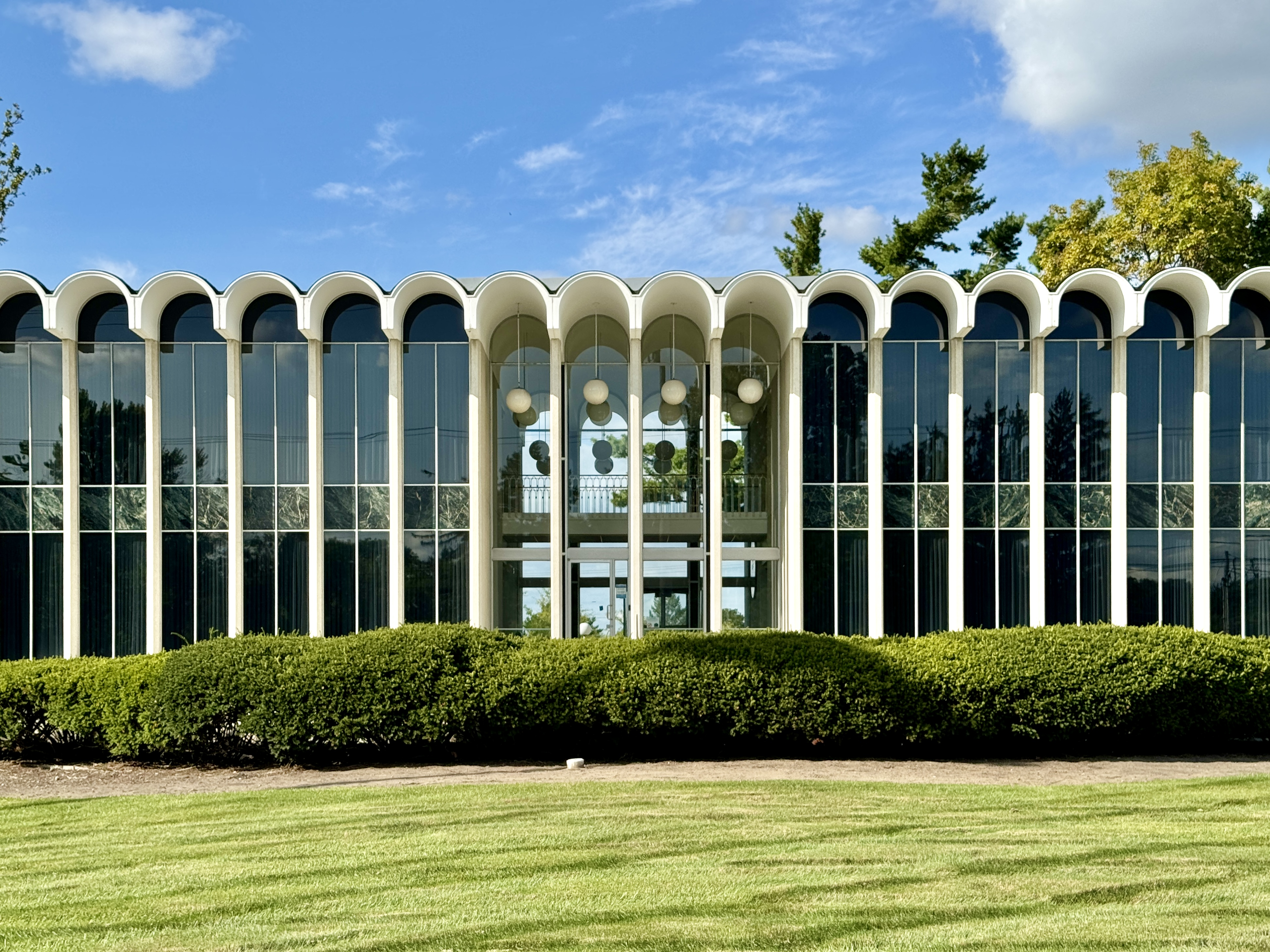
- Downtown East Lansing Eli and Edythe Broad Art Museum Red Cedar River Michigan State Medical Society Building
- Interactive map of East Lansing, Michigan
- Location within the state of Michigan Location within the United States East Lansing (North America)
- Coordinates: 42°44′53″N 84°29′01″W
- Country: United States
- State: Michigan
- Counties: Clinton and Ingham
- Settled: 1847
- Incorporated: 1907

Government
  - Type: Council–manager
  - Mayor: George Brookover
  - Manager: Robert Belleman

Area
  - Total: 13.51 sq mi (35.00 km^{2})
  - Land: 13.43 sq mi (34.79 km^{2})
  - Water: 0.081 sq mi (0.21 km^{2})
- Elevation: 856 ft (261 m)

Population (2020)
  - Total: 47,741
  - Density: 3,554.4/sq mi (1,372.37/km^{2})
- Time zone: UTC-5 (EST)
  - Summer (DST): UTC-4 (EDT)
- ZIP code(s): 48808 (Bath); 48823–48826; 48906, 48910, 48912 (Lansing)
- Area code: 517
- FIPS code: 26-24120
- GNIS feature ID: 1626207
- Website: www.cityofeastlansing.com

East Lansing is a city in Ingham and Clinton counties in the U.S. state of Michigan. A college town, East Lansing is home to Michigan State University (MSU), one of the largest public universities in the United States. As of 2026, the city has a population of 49,435. The city is located immediately east of Lansing, Michigan's capital and sixth most populous city; the two cities anchor the Lansing–East Lansing metropolitan area.

== History ==
East Lansing is located on land that was an important junction of two major Native American groups: the Potawatomi and the Fox. By 1850, the Lansing and Howell Plank Road Company was established to connect a toll road to the Detroit and Howell Plank Road, improving travel between Detroit and Lansing, which cut right through what is now East Lansing. The toll road was finished in 1853, and included seven toll houses between Lansing and Howell.

Michigan State University was founded in 1855 and established in what is now East Lansing in 1857. For the first four decades, the students and faculty lived almost entirely on the college campus. A few commuted from Lansing, and that number increased when a streetcar line was built in the 1890s, but there were few places to live in the then-rural area surrounding the campus.

That started to change in 1887, when professors William J. Beal and Rolla C. Carpenter created Collegeville, along what is now Harrison Road and Center and Beal Streets, north of Michigan Avenue. Few faculty were attracted to the location, and the first residents were "teamsters and laborers". In 1898, the College Delta subdivision (including what is now Delta Street) had the support of the college itself, which provided utilities, and several professors built homes there (one of which survives today at 243 W. Grand River Ave.). Other subdivisions followed.

At that time, the post office address was "Agricultural College, Michigan". A school district encompassing the nascent community was created in 1900. In 1907, incorporation as a city was proposed under the name "College Park"; the legislature approved the charter but changed the name to "East Lansing". The first seven mayors, starting with Clinton D. Smith in 1907 and Warren Babcock in 1908, were professors or employees of the college.

The city charter in 1907 prohibited the possession, sale, or consumption of alcoholic beverages, and East Lansing was a "dry" city until voters modified the charter provision in 1968. In the 21st century, downtown East Lansing has enjoyed a construction boom. Multiple city center complexes have resulted in the redevelopment of large parts of the historic downtown area, at a greatly increased population density.

== Geography ==
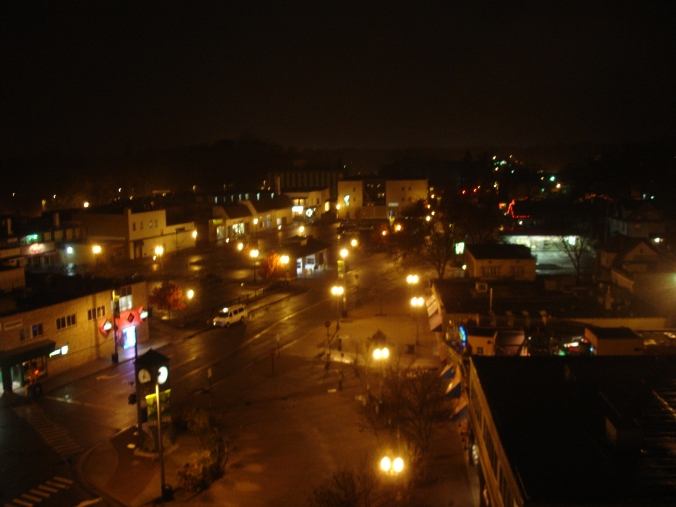
Downtown East Lansing at night, overlooking Albert Street

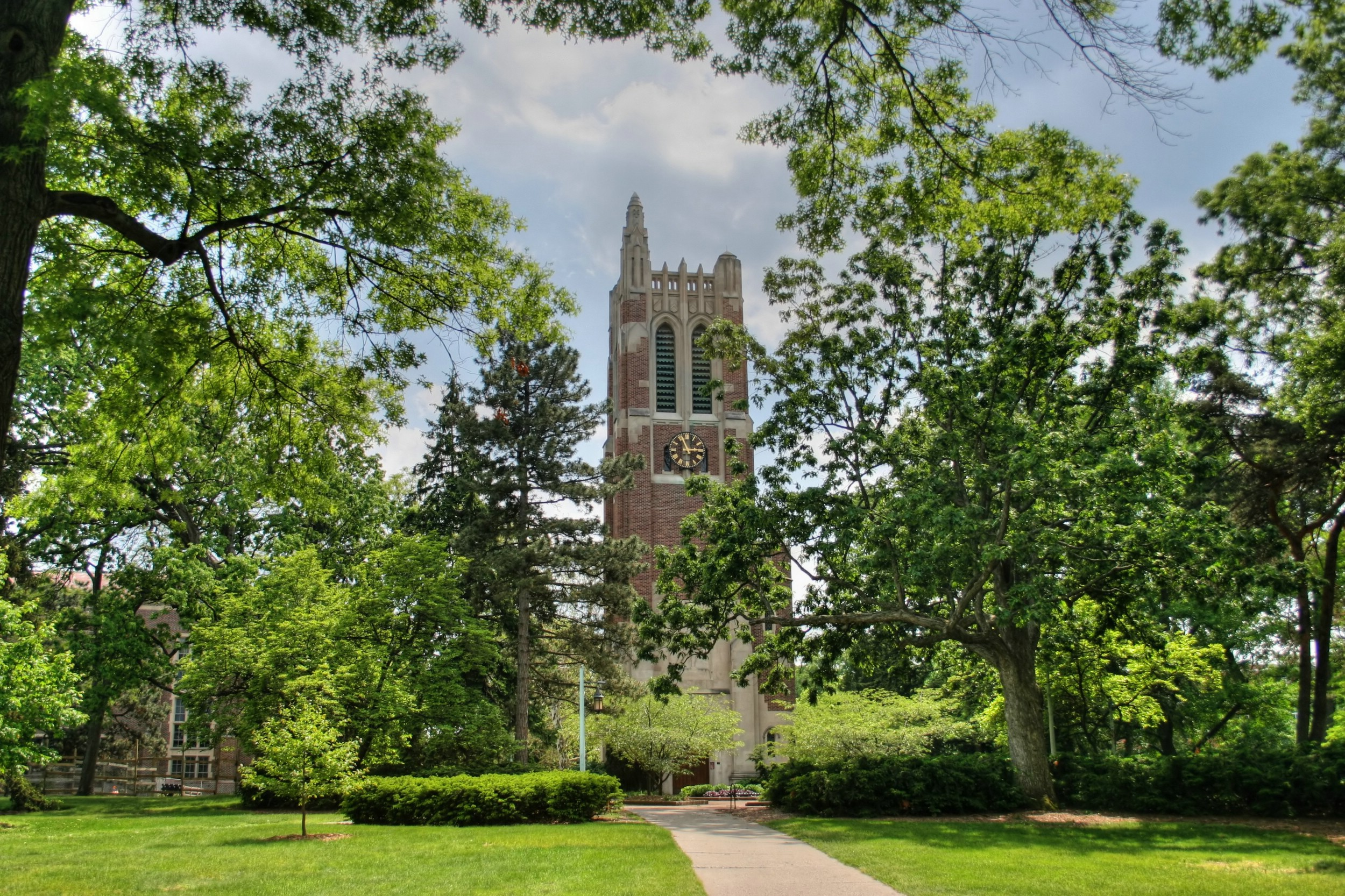
Beaumont Tower at Michigan State University

According to the United States Census Bureau, the city has a total area of 13.67 square miles (35.41 km^{2}), of which 13.59 square miles (35.20 km^{2}) is land and 0.08 square miles (0.21 km^{2}) is water.

Since 1998, East Lansing has expanded its borders through the use of 425 Agreements. The city is currently in three 425 Agreements with Bath Township, DeWitt Township, and Meridian Township, and has effectively added thousands of acres of land to its border.

- East Lansing and DeWitt Township entered into two 425s in 1998 and 2001, which involved nearly 1,200 acres (4.9 km^{2}) of land. The agreement stipulates that East Lansing gains full control of the land after 33 years.
- East Lansing and Bath Township entered into a 425 Agreement in June 2002 involving 1,056 acres (4.27 km^{2}) of land. The agreement stipulates that East Lansing gains full control of the land after 100 years.
- East Lansing and Meridian Township entered into a 425 in November 2002 involving 101 acres (0.41 km^{2}) of land. The agreement stipulates that the Meridian Township residents get to decide the fate of the land after 100 years.

The city has also made use of annexation of surrounding township lands in recent years. It annexed the 66.5 acres (26.9 ha) of the Four Winds Golf Course in Meridian Township in 2001, and another 6 acres (2.4 ha) of the township in 2006. The city also annexed from DeWitt Township the land that is currently the East Lansing Soccer Complex.

=== Description ===
The city's downtown area is centered around Grand River Avenue, a wide, tree-lined boulevard that evolved out of the 19th-century plank road that connected Lansing to Detroit. Grand River Avenue and Michigan Avenue serve as a dividing line between the Michigan State University campus and the rest of the city. Immediately north of downtown are college town neighborhoods, where students and year-round residents can live close to the city's downtown and MSU's campus.

=== Neighborhoods ===
East Lansing has more than 25 neighborhoods. Many of these have neighborhood associations that sponsor social events, attend to neighborhood issues and often advocate for neighborhood interests in meetings of the city council and city commissions.

A section of the city has been designated a Historic District, and a Historic District Commission has been established by the city council. In addition, many landmark structures in the older neighborhoods have been identified within a Landmark Structures Historic District of the Historic Preservation Code.

== Demographics ==
Historical population
Census	Pop.	Note	%±
1910	802		—
1920	1,889		135.5%
1930	4,380		131.9%
1940	5,839		33.3%
1950	20,325		248.1%
1960	30,198		48.6%
1970	47,540		57.4%
1980	51,392		8.1%
1990	50,677		−1.4%
2000	46,525		−8.2%
2010	48,579		4.4%
2020	47,741		−1.7%
2025 (est.)	49,355		3.4%
U.S. Decennial Census

=== 2020 census ===
As of the 2020 census, East Lansing had a population of 47,741. The median age was 21.8 years. 10.0% of residents were under the age of 18 and 8.3% of residents were 65 years of age or older. For every 100 females there were 97.5 males, and for every 100 females age 18 and over there were 97.1 males age 18 and over.

99.8% of residents lived in urban areas, while 0.2% lived in rural areas.

There were 14,883 households in East Lansing, of which 16.6% had children under the age of 18 living in them. Of all households, 25.7% were married-couple households, 33.0% were households with a male householder and no spouse or partner present, and 36.0% were households with a female householder and no spouse or partner present. About 38.7% of all households were made up of individuals and 8.6% had someone living alone who was 65 years of age or older.

There were 16,590 housing units, of which 10.3% were vacant. The homeowner vacancy rate was 2.1% and the rental vacancy rate was 7.9%.

Racial composition as of the 2020 census
Race	Number	Percent
White	34,095	71.4%
Black or African American	5,776	12.1%
American Indian and Alaska Native	177	0.4%
Asian	4,209	8.8%
Native Hawaiian and Other Pacific Islander	49	0.1%
Some other race	968	2.0%
Two or more races	2,467	5.2%
Hispanic or Latino (of any race)	2,477	5.2%

=== 2010 census ===
As of the census of 2010, there were 48,579 people, 14,774 households, and 4,811 families residing in the city. The population density was 3,574.6 inhabitants per square mile (1,380.2/km^{2}). There were 15,787 housing units at an average density of 1,161.7 per square mile (448.5/km^{2}). The racial makeup of the city was 78.4% White, 10.6% Asian, 6.8% African American, 0.3% Native American, 1.0% from other races, and 2.9% from two or more races. Hispanic or Latino people of any race were 3.4% of the population.

There were 14,774 households, of which 13.8% had children under the age of 18 living with them, 24.7% were married couples living together, 5.6% had a female householder with no husband present, 2.2% had a male householder with no wife present, and 67.4% were non-families. 33.3% of all households were made up of individuals, and 7.6% had someone living alone who was 65 years of age or older. The average household size was 2.23 and the average family size was 2.80.

The median age in the city was 21.6 years. 7.5% of residents were under the age of 18; 62.4% were between the ages of 18 and 24; 14.6% were from 25 to 44; 9.2% were from 45 to 64; and 6.4% were 65 years of age or older. The gender makeup of the city was 48.5% male and 51.5% female.

=== 2000 census ===
As of the census of 2000, there were 46,525 people, 14,390 households, and 5,094 families residing in the city. The population density was 4,136.6 inhabitants per square mile (1,597.2/km^{2}). There were 15,321 housing units at an average density of 1,362.2 per square mile (525.9/km^{2}). The racial makeup of the city was 80.91% White, 8.21% Asian, 7.40% African American, 0.33% Native American, 0.08% Pacific Islander, 0.95% from other races, and 2.12% from two or more races. Hispanic or Latino people of any race were 2.69% of the population.

There were 14,390 households, out of which 16.1% had children under the age of 18 living with them, 27.6% were married couples living together, 5.7% had a female householder with no husband present, and 64.6% were non-families. 36.2% of all households were made up of individuals, and 7.2% had someone living alone who was 65 years of age or older. The average household size was 2.22 and the average family size was 2.82.

In the city, the population was spread out, with 9.0% under the age of 18, 58.6% from 18 to 24, 16.4% from 25 to 44, 9.9% from 45 to 64, and 6.0% who were 65 years of age or older. The median age was 22 years. For every 100 females, there were 92.7 males. For every 100 females age 18 and over, there were 91.7 males.

The median income for a household in the city was $28,217, and the median income for a family was $61,985 (these figures had risen to $29,885 and $81,941 respectively as of a 2007 estimate). Males had a median income of $43,767 versus $30,556 for females. The per capita income for the city was $16,333. About 11.0% of families and 34.8% of the population were below the poverty line, including 13.8% of those under age 18 and 3.7% of those age 65 or over.

== Government ==
East Lansing has a council-manager government, in which the city council appoints one of its members as mayor and another as mayor pro tem – a city council member with extra ceremonial duties who chairs council meetings in the mayor's absence. The city council consists of 5 at-large council members who are elected in non-partisan elections to 4-year terms in November of odd-numbered years. The city council chooses the city manager, the city's chief administrative officer. The manager is appointed by and answers to the council.

The current mayor is Erik Altmann. Chuck Grigsby is the current mayor pro tem and was elected to city council in 2025. The other members of the city council are Kerry Ebersole Singh, elected in 2023; Steven Whalen, elected in 2025; and Mark Meadows, elected in 2023.

An important aspect of East Lansing's government is its system of commissions. The commission members are ordinary East Lansing citizens appointed by the city council and advised by members of the city staff. Commissions may propose or review policies in their bailiwicks and make recommendations to the council. Major East Lansing commissions and boards include those for Planning, Zoning, Housing, Transportation, and Parks and Recreation. Other commissions and boards that also involve active engagement of ordinary citizens play a role in East Lansing's governance.

East Lansing Government founded the Technology Innovation Center, an incubator for technology start-ups.

== Education ==
=== Higher education ===
Michigan State University, a member of the Big Ten Conference, is the largest education institution in the State of Michigan (9th largest in the United States), reflecting East Lansing's history as a college town. MSU has more than 200 programs of study. It has two medical schools, the allopathic College of Human Medicine issuing the MD degree, and the osteopathic College of Osteopathic Medicine issuing the DO degree. It has a School of Veterinary Medicine issuing the DVM degree. It has a College of Law issuing three degrees: the Juris Doctor (J.D.), the Master of Laws (LL.M.), and the Master of Jurisprudence (M.J.). There are numerous Doctor of Philosophy (Ph.D.) programs. There is also a Master of Arts in Technology (MAET) program.

Nearby Lansing is home to several other colleges, including Thomas M. Cooley Law School which is the largest law school in the United States (by attendees), Davenport University, and Lansing Community College.

=== Public primary and secondary schools ===
Most of the city is covered by the East Lansing Public Schools district.

Within Ingham County, portions of East Lansing are within the East Lansing school district, the Lansing School District, Okemos Public Schools, and Haslett Public Schools.

Within Clinton County, portions of East Lansing are within the Lansing School District, the East Lansing School District, and Bath Community Schools.

The East Lansing district has an enrollment of just over 3,400 students in grades K-12. The district also includes small portions of neighboring Lansing, Lansing Township, and Meridian Township. The district consists of six elementary schools, one middle school (MacDonald Middle School), and East Lansing High School. One fifth of the district's students come from outside of East Lansing through Michigan's Schools of Choice program.

=== Private schools ===
- St. Thomas Aquinas Parish School, 915 Alton Road - Catholic schools in the area are under the Diocese of Lansing
- Stepping Stones Montessori School, 1370 Beech Street

== Transportation ==
=== Local transportation ===
Capital Area Transportation Authority (CATA) provides public bus transit throughout East Lansing, Lansing, and surrounding areas.

The Northern Tier Trail is a shared-use pedestrian and bicycle path system connecting some parts of the northern half of the city; the Lansing River Trail begins on the campus of Michigan State University and extends west into downtown Lansing and then north towards the airport.

=== Intercity transportation ===
Amtrak and Indian Trails provide intercity rail and bus services at the Capital Area Multimodal Gateway, which is located at 1240 South Harrison Road, within walking distance of the Michigan State University main campus. CATA transportation is also based out of the CAMG.

Amtrak offers daily service to East Lansing on its Port Huron to Union Station, Chicago train, the Blue Water. Two class one freight railroads serve the city including Canadian National Railway (CN) and CSX Transportation (CSXT).

Bus transportation is offered between East Lansing and Detroit Metro Airport twelve times daily by Michigan Flyer.

The Capital Region International Airport in nearby Lansing offers regional non-stop domestic flights; connections between East Lansing and the airport are offered by CATA (with a transfer in downtown Lansing); rental cars are also available at the airport.

Three major interstates and one U.S. Highway serve the East Lansing area including Interstate 96 (I-96), I-69, I-496, and U.S. Highway 127 (US 127).

=== Major highways ===
- I-69 runs from Indianapolis, along the northern boundary of East Lansing, and east to Flint and Port Huron, connecting to Canada.
- BL I-69 is a loop route running through Lansing and East Lansing.
- US 127 is a north–south highway passing between Lansing and East Lansing, continuing northerly toward Clare and Grayling and southerly toward Jackson, Michigan and into Ohio.
- M-43 (Saginaw Street, Grand River Avenue) serves as a major east–west thoroughfare through the city. In downtown East Lansing, the route separates the central business district of the city from the campus of Michigan State University.
- M-143 (Michigan Avenue) is a route between M-43 and the Lansing city limit.

== Culture ==
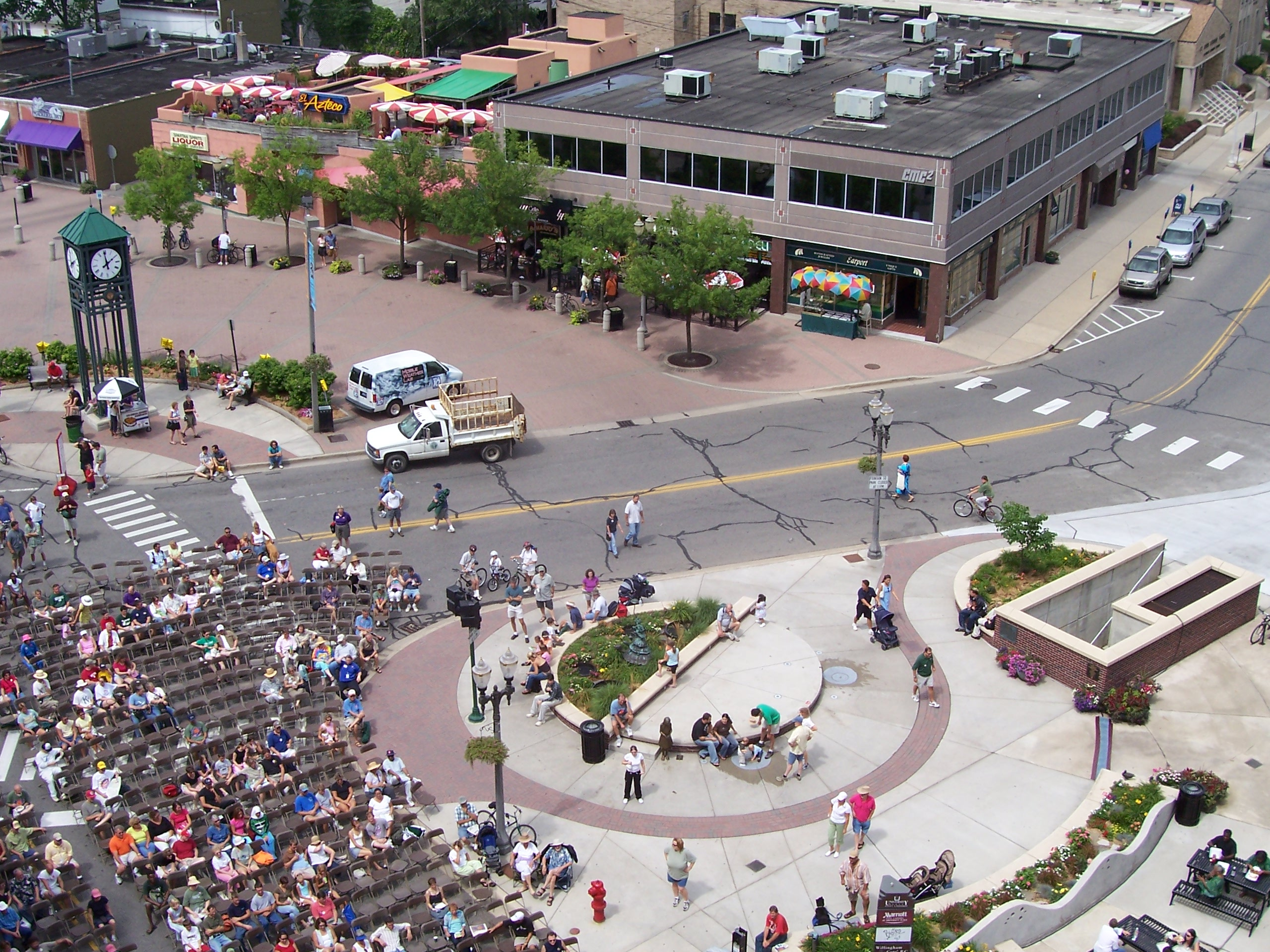
The Great Lakes Folk Festival in East Lansing's Ann Street Plaza

The city has several neighborhoods of detached, single-family houses within a mile of the Michigan State University campus. Under a 2004 city zoning ordinance, several of those neighborhoods have used a petition process to establish zones that prohibit or severely restrict renting. The net size of the area where renting is prohibited has increased since 2004.

East Lansing has a very large student population; in 2006 the city's population was about 45,931, while the university's 2006–07 enrollment was 45,520. Granted, not all students enrolled live in East Lansing or on campus.

=== Centennial ===
In 2007, the City of East Lansing celebrated its Centennial. The celebration began in January 2007 with a kick-off press conference at the Marriott Hotel in downtown East Lansing. Events throughout the year included an old fashion concert, a birthday party, and a historic homes tour. A fireworks show took place in August, along with many more events throughout the year.

== Sites of interest ==
=== On campus ===
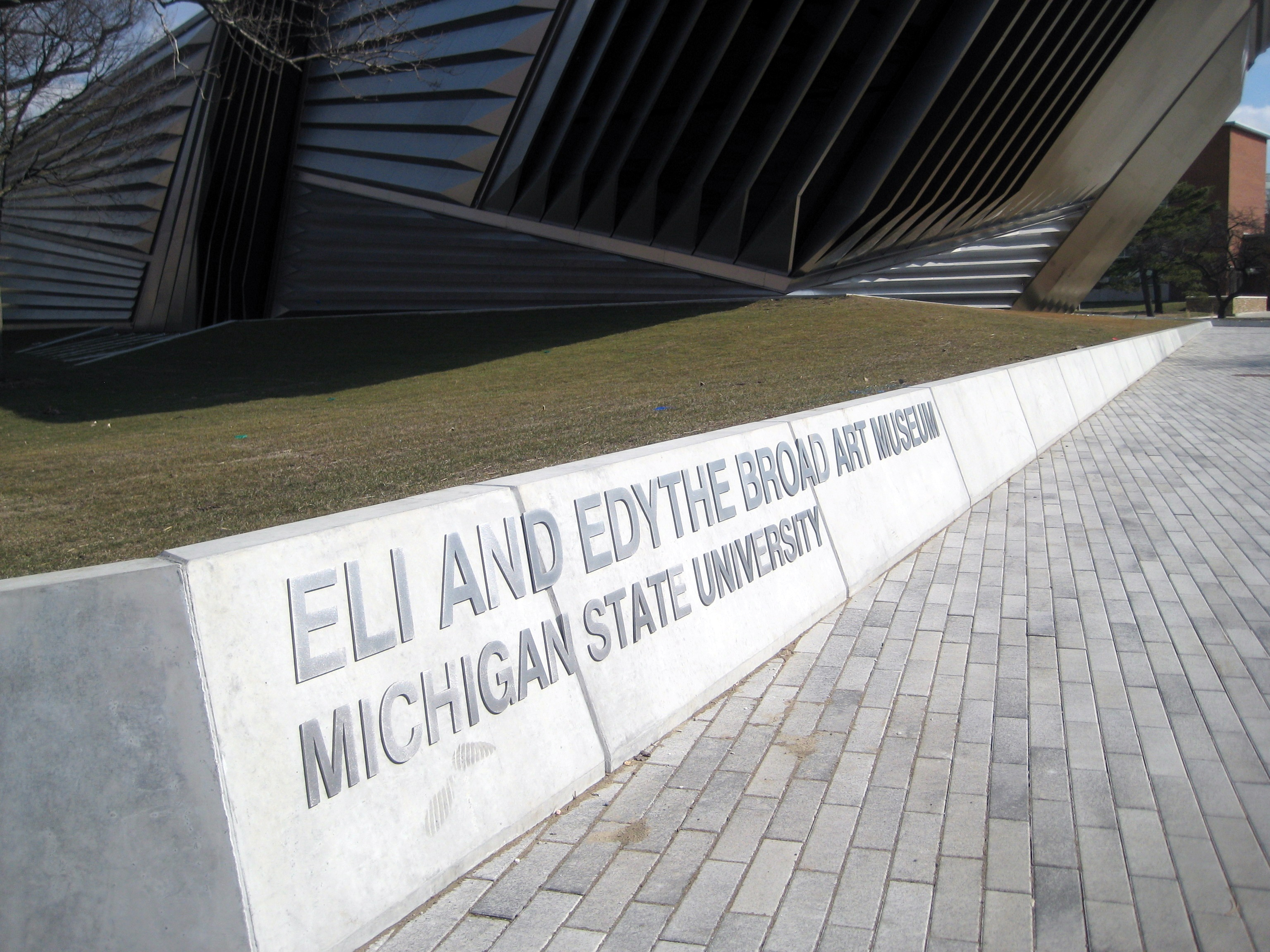
Broad Art Museum at Michigan State University

- W. J. Beal Botanical Garden, is the oldest botanical garden in the United States
- Michigan State University Horticulture Gardens
- Beaumont Tower
- Red Cedar River
- Wharton Center for the Performing Arts (Great Hall and Pasant Theatre), the Fairchild Theatre, and the MSU Auditorium (Main Stage and Arena Theater)
- Eli and Edythe Broad Art Museum
- Abrams Planetarium and the MSU Observatory
- Spartan Stadium
- Breslin Center
- MSU Forest Akers Golf Courses
- MSU Pavilion
- MSU Federal Credit Union, the largest university-based credit union in the world
- CATA Bus Station
- Sparty is the nickname of The Spartan, a large statue representing the MSU mascot, a Spartan warrior. "Sparty" is frequently used as a landmark when giving directions on campus.
- The Rock is a large boulder, approximately five feet high, originally placed near Beaumont Tower by the Class of 1873, since relocated to a site northeast of the Farm Lane Bridge. It serves as a venue for student groups and is routinely graffitied by those groups.
- Facility for Rare Isotope Beams, formerly the National Superconducting Cyclotron Laboratory

=== Off campus ===
- Hannah Community Center (originally built as East Lansing High School, and later used as the junior high school, and then a middle school) featuring the Albert A. White Performing Arts Theatre
- East Lansing Public Library
- The "Habitrail", Hamster Cage, or Gerbil Cage, is a large multicolored parking structure near campus that resembles a Habitrail home for pet rodents. The controversial design resulted from the city's instructions to the architect that the building be "festive" and have "no brick".
- Saper Galleries, an award-winning art gallery serving clients internationally since 1978, is in a contemporary gallery building in downtown East Lansing on Albert Avenue.
- Scene metrospace, the city sponsored art gallery located in the ground floor of the multicolored parking structure
- East Lansing Family Aquatic Center
- Trowbridge railroad junction (located near Trowbridge Road) and the nearby Amtrak depot are popular spots with railfans for train watching. At Trowbridge, the busy Grand Trunk Western Railroad line connecting Chicago to Toronto intersects the former Pere Marquette Railroad (now CSX line from Detroit to Grand Rapids).
- Coral Gables has undergone significant transformations throughout its rich history. It transitioned from a roadhouse in the 1920s, to a square-dance hall in the 1930s, to a big band showcase in the 1940s that attracted well-known musicians such as Tommy Dorsey, Sam Donahue, Duke Ellington, Stan Kenton, Woody Herman and The Ink Spots, to a rock ‘n’ roll diner in the late 1950s, and then to a family-owned restaurant in the late 1960s.

=== Outside East Lansing ===
- The city of Lansing is adjacent to East Lansing. Lansing has, among other things, the State Capitol, Hall of Justice (Supreme Court), and Michigan Library and Historical Center. Thomas M. Cooley Law School, the nation's largest law school, is located in downtown Lansing. Lansing also is the home of the Lansing Lugnuts minor league baseball team. There is a City Market in downtown Lansing, next to the Grand River.
- Lake Lansing is nearby and is approximately 500 acres (200 hectares) in size. The lake has an outstanding beach, and is a summer favorite of swimmers, sunbathers, boaters and fishermen. The Lansing Sailing Club and Michigan State University Sailing Club have facilities on Lake Lansing where sailing regattas are held throughout the summer months.
- Meridian Mall is located in the suburb of Okemos, and Eastwood Towne Center in Lansing Township.

== Newspapers ==
- The State News
- East Lansing Info (ELi)
- Lansing State Journal
- City Pulse
- Spartan Edge
- East Lansing Towne Courier (1962-2022)

== Local events ==
- The East Lansing Film Festival is the largest festival of its kind in Michigan.
- East Lansing Art Festival is a juried art show held each spring on the weekend before Memorial Day. In 2009 it received a national ranking in the Art Fair Sourcebook Top 200 for its fine art and craft sales. "With its 117th fine art ranking and 153rd fine craft ranking, the festival was included among a list of the top 200 best-selling art fairs and festivals in the country. These rankings are based on the festival's gross average sales for 2009, which totaled $2,857 per artist exhibitor".
- Great Lakes Folk Festival originated after The National Folk Festival, which made East Lansing its home for three years, moved to a new city for another three years. The festival is usually held during the second weekend of August.
- The Michigan High School Boys State Basketball Championship tournament is typically held at Michigan State University's Breslin Center each March.
- The 2007 and 2023 Odyssey of the Mind World Finals occurred at Michigan State University.
- The 2009 Future Problem Solvers International Conference was held in East Lansing.
- The Children's Concerts held at East Lansing Hannah Community Center, is an annual series of live music geared for young audiences and their families.
- The Crystal Awards honors the extraordinary accomplishments of individuals, businesses and organizations that have impacted the quality of life in East Lansing.
- The Summer Solstice Jazz Festival is a two-day festival that salutes jazz music with local and national jazz performers and celebrates the longest day of the year.
- The Summer Concert Series features live local music each Friday and Saturday in Downtown East Lansing.
- The Moonlight Film Festival offers free movies on an outdoor big screen in Valley Court Park in downtown East Lansing.
- One Book One Community is a unique program that brings the city-university community together to read the same book and come together to discuss it in a variety of settings.
- The Winter Glow features holiday activities, musical entertainment and merchant activities. The Festival is usually takes place at the Ann Street Plaza, Parking Lot 1 and the East Lansing Marriott.
- Cedar Fest was an annual festival held in the 1970s and 1980s.

== Notable people ==
- Spencer Abraham: former US senator and Secretary of Energy
- Rosemarie Aquilina: Judge of the 30th circuit court in Ingham County, Michigan
- Chuck Bullough: former NFL player for Syracuse
- Jim Cash: screenwriter, long-time resident of East Lansing and a professor at MSU
- Harry A. DeMaso: Michigan state legislator
- Kevin DeYoung: pastor, author
- Rachael Eubanks: 47th Michigan State Treasurer
- Richard Lenski: evolutionary biologist at MSU
- Todd Martin: tennis pro; 1988 graduate of ELHS
- Julie Mehretu: graduate of ELHS, artist
- Drew Miller: wing player for the Detroit Red Wings; brother of Ryan Miller
- Ryan Miller: Hobey Baker winner at MSU, NHL goalie
- General Robert Neller, commandant of the Marine Corps
- Larry Page: 1991 graduate of ELHS, Google founder
- Wally Pleasant: comedic folk singer
- Ben Poquette: NBA basketball player
- Susan May Pratt: actress
- Nate Silver: statistician-journalist
- Farah Stockman: Pulitzer Prize-winning journalist
- Gretchen Whitmer: 49th and current governor of Michigan
