= Lansing River Trail =

Recreational trail in Michigan, United States

Coordinates: 42°42′58″N 84°31′24″W

- Lansing River Trail near Kalamazoo St. and Cedar St. intersection.
- Length: 13 mi (21 km)
- Location: Lansing / East Lansing, Michigan, USA
- Trailheads: MSU campus, Dietrich Park, North Lansing
- Use: Hiking, Running, Biking, Roller skating
- Difficulty: Easy
- Season: Year Round
- Sights: Grand River; Red Cedar River
- Hazards: Flooding, Overhead clearance
- Website: lansingrivertrail.org

The Lansing River Trail is a multiple use trail approximately 13 miles (21 km) long. It runs along the Grand River and the Red Cedar River between Michigan State University and Dietrich Park in northern Lansing. The first segment of trail opened in 1975. It was designated a National Recreation Trail in 1981.

The River Trail is also home to a number of special events, including the Annual Mayor's Walk, Michigan Run, the Capital City River Run and a number of other city-sponsored activities.

== Expansion ==
=== Extensions ===
The trail has a western extension that begins where it splits off at River Point park just south of downtown Lansing and ends in Moores Park.

The River Trail South stretches along Sycamore Creek from Potter Park to Maguire Park in southeast Lansing. The stretch from Hawk Island County Park to Maguire Park, known as the South Extension, was completed in 2008.

=== Connections ===
At Maguire Park, the trail connects with the South Lansing Pathway, which stretches west to Waverly Road utilizing a Consumers Energy Electric power transmission corridor with a small branch stretching northeast to Cavanaugh Road, completed in 2014. The South Lansing Pathway added 5.8 miles (9 km) to the city's trail system. Also at Maguire Park, the trail connects with Delhi Township's Sycamore Trail, also completed in 2014, traveling south and connecting with the Valhalla Trail in Holt.

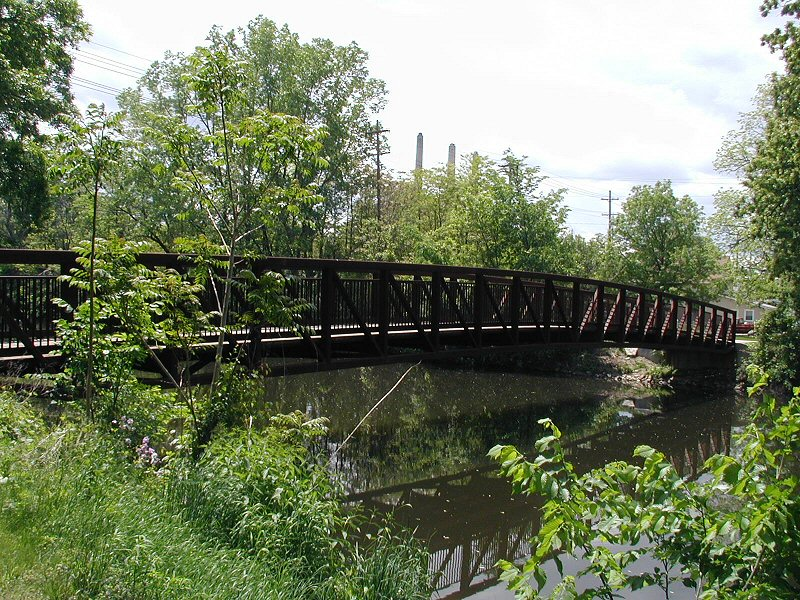
A pedestrian bridge of the Lansing River Trail at Riverpoint Park.

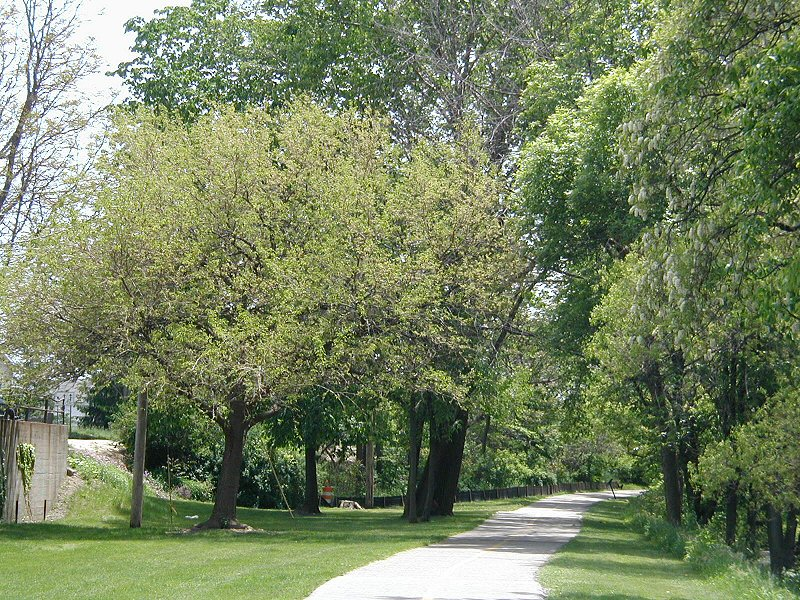
Lansing River Trail just south of the Kalamazoo Street Bridge in downtown Lansing.

River Trail near Kalamazoo Street.

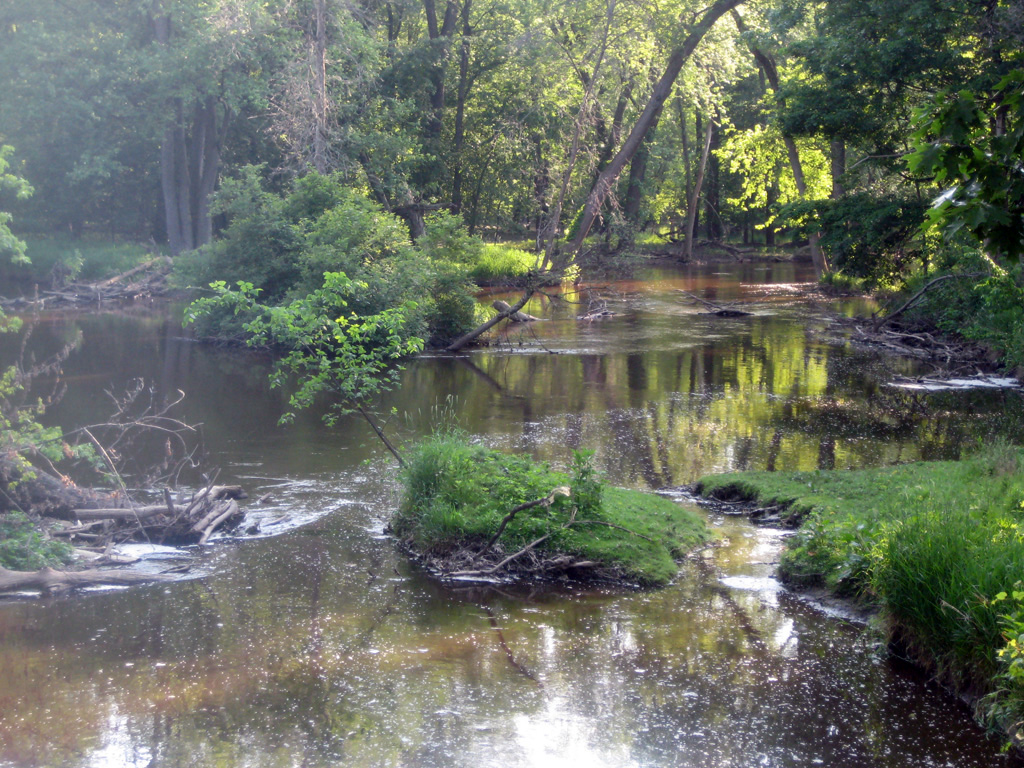
River Trail along Red Cedar River near Potter Park Zoo.

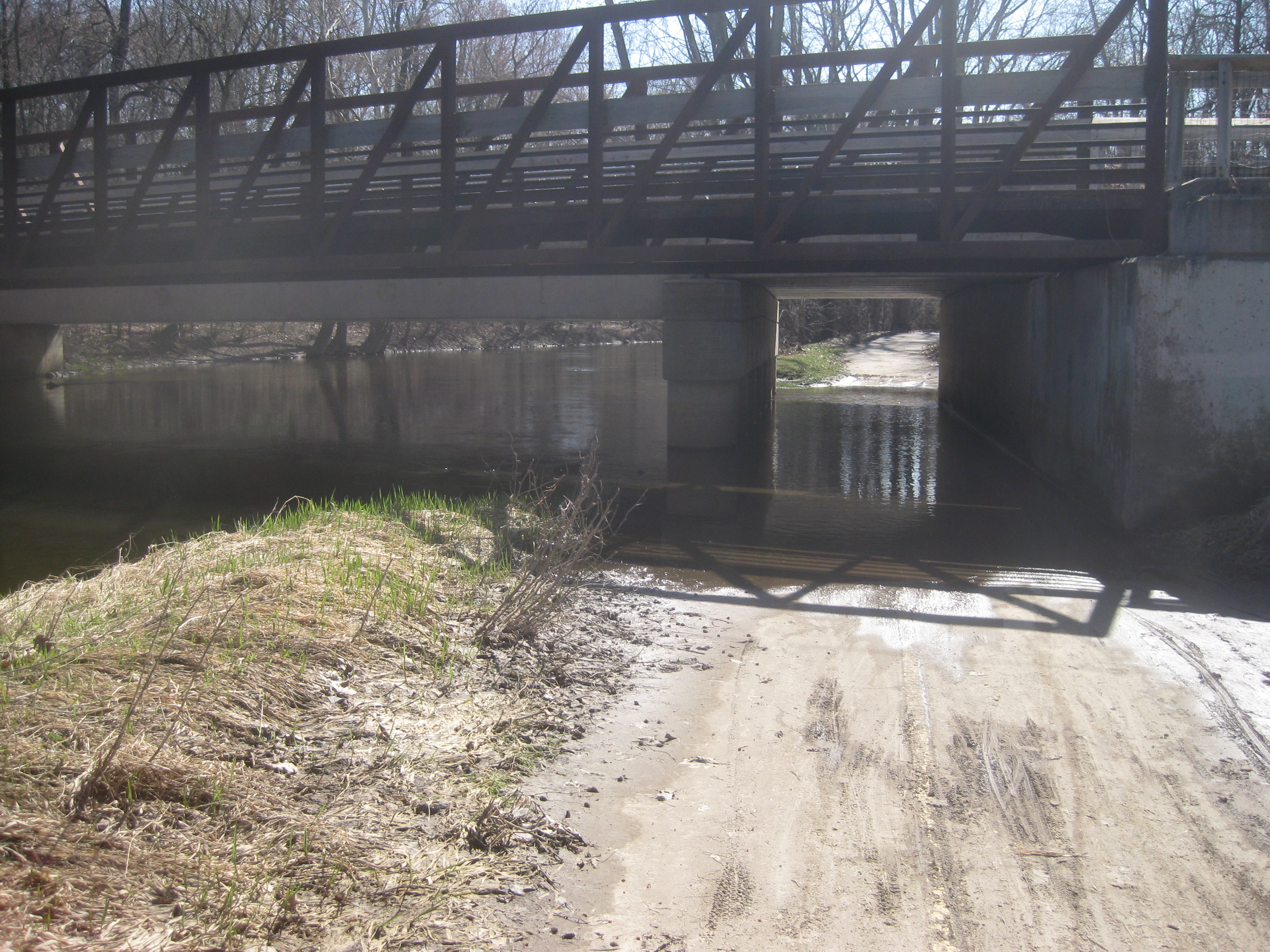
High waters along the Red Cedar render the trail impassable under Kalamazoo Rd.

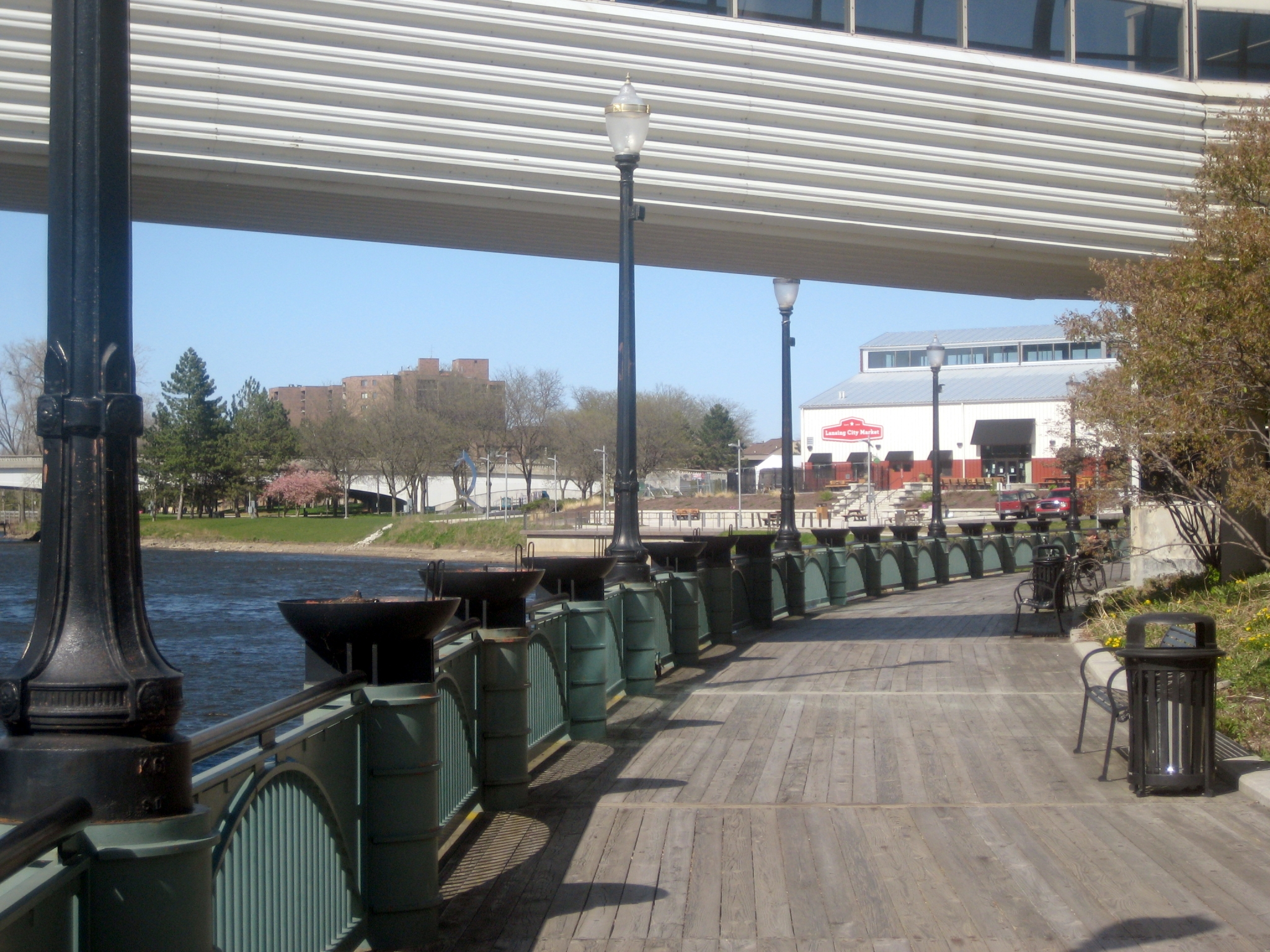
River Trail in downtown Lansing with City Market in distance.
