= Michigan State Medical Society Building =

- U.S. National Register of Historic Places
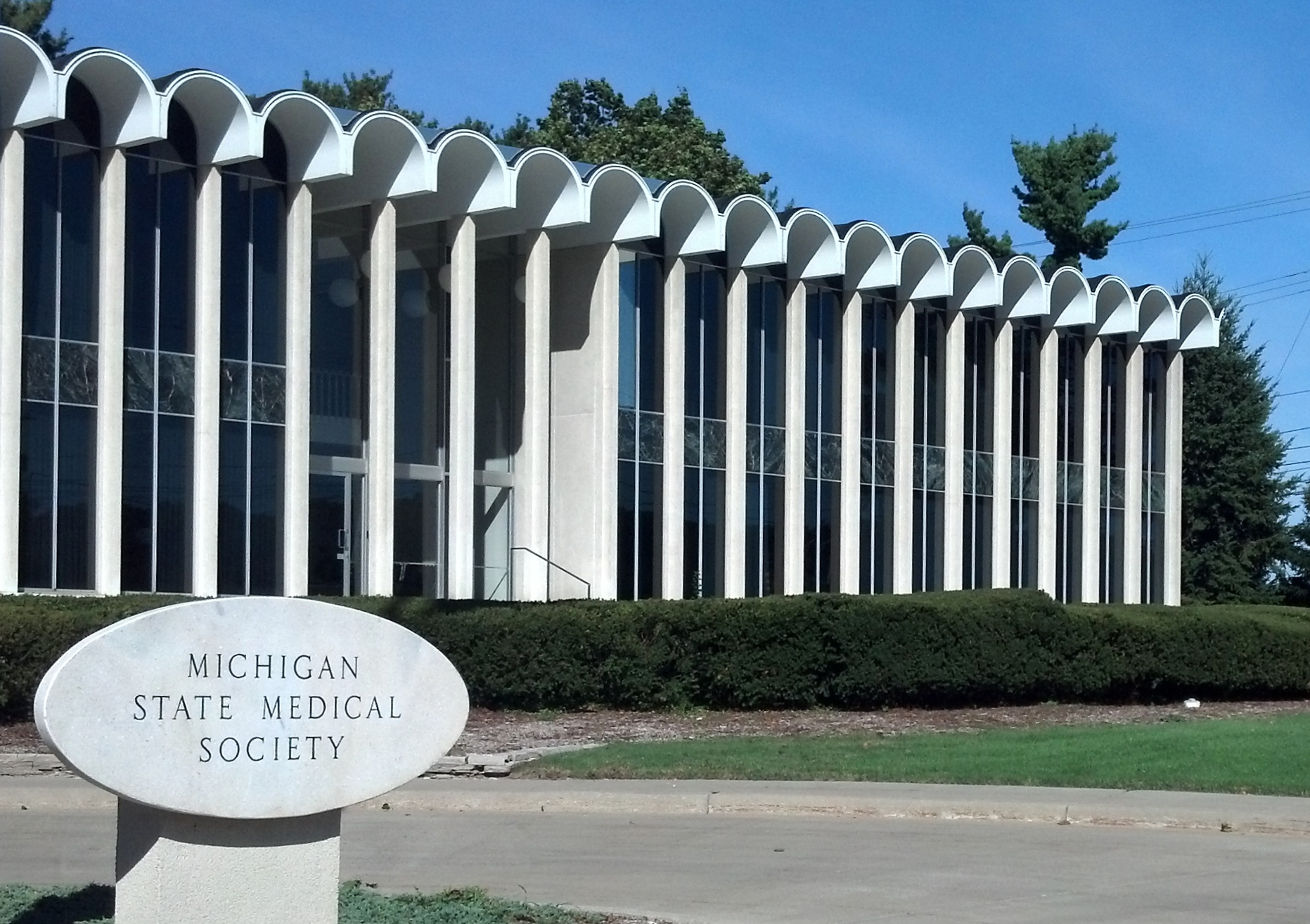
- Interactive map
- Location: 120 W. Saginaw St., East Lansing, Michigan
- Coordinates: 42°44′49″N 84°29′05″W
- Area: 3.5 acres (1.4 ha)
- Built: 1959
- Built by: Christman Co.
- Architect: Minoru Yamasaki
- Architectural style: Modern Movement
- NRHP reference No.: 11000864
- Added to NRHP: November 30, 2011

The Michigan State Medical Society Building is an office building located at 120 W. Saginaw Street in East Lansing, Michigan. It was listed on the National Register of Historic Places in 2011.

== History ==
The Michigan State Medical Society was created in 1866 to promote fellowship among medical professionals. The Society used a string of temporary rental buildings as their headquarters, first in Detroit, and then in Lansing. By the 1950s, the group clearly needed a larger, and permanent, home. The Society purchased a plot of land in which to build, and in 1959 hired architect Minoru Yamasaki to design a building. The contract was the first for Yamasaki outside of metro Detroit, and came on the heels of his landmark 1958 design of Wayne State University's McGregor Memorial Conference Center. Construction began in 1959 and was completed in 1961.

The Michigan State Medical Society has owned and occupy from the date of its construction. An addition, known as the "Stockwell Wing," was constructed in 1979 and is linked to the main building with a short connector. The Stockwell Wing was also designed by the Yamasaki firm, and complements the original building in design.

== Description ==
The Michigan State Medical Society Building is a two-story Modern office building. It is set back from the road and sited on a small rise; the surrounding grounds are terraced. The facade of the building consists of a series of slender white cast concrete columns set apart on five foot centers. Between the columns are floor-to-ceiling height panes of tinted glass, with polished marble panels between the two floors. At the roofline, the columns are connected by cast-concrete arches, which create an arched vaulted ceiling on the interior. Under the arches are semicircular glass lights.

On the entrance facade, five exterior columns provide shelter to a slightly off-center entryway. The entryway leads to a full-height lobby. A lower two-story addition, visually subservient to the main building, is at one end of the structure.
