= Cedar Fest =

Festival

Cedar Fest was an annual festival held in East Lansing, Michigan, between 1983 and 1987.

== Early history ==
The event, which started in the 1970s, was started by Paul Stanley who was the head of pop entertainment which was Michigan State University‘s student entertainment board. Pop entertainment had made a large sum of money that year and it was a means that Paul created to basically give back to the students. Cedar fest was to be a beautiful spring day down by the Red Cedar River with live known bands. The first year hosted mainly folk guitar acts and drew around 8000 students that enjoyed the beautiful day at the Cedar River. The following year cedar fest Drew approximately 10,000 to 12,000 people to The Red Cedar River banks for the concert. The event was held in Cedar Village, a densely populated student neighborhood bordering the Michigan State University campus. The event took off in the 1980s and was regularly attended by thousands. Several riots ensued from the parties and property owners along with the city decided to put an end to the event. In 1987 the event was banned by an injunctive order issued by Judge Carolyn Stell. For many years it was not held.

== 2008 revival ==
Cedar Fest saw a revival in 2008, 21 years after the city had officially banned the event. The revival, which began as a campaign on Facebook as early as January, promised a "weekend long party" that would take place "throughout all of Cedar Village." It drew up to 4,000 party goers and was officially declared an unlawful assembly as police launched 24 smoke grenades, 20 flash bangs, 20 stingball grenades and 13 rounds of tear gas to disperse the out-of-control crowd. Some revelers threw bottles, cans and bricks at police officers, while two city vehicles' windows were broken, and at least four fires were set. East Lansing police Chief Tom Wibert remarked that the event "got to the point where I don’t see how we could have dispersed that crowd without tear gas." In fact, Wibert said after the police used flash bangs and smoke bombs, some students began to chant for tear gas. The "riot" cost close to $10,000 in damages and resulted in 52 arrests, 28 of them being MSU students. Police estimated that about 5% of MSU's student population was at the event. Not a single citizen's complaint was made against the police regarding this riot, a complete turn around from the flood of complaints which occurred following the riot after the NCAA loss in 2005.

Observers noted that police were more restrained compared to their handling of the 2005 riot after MSU's Final Four loss. In that incident, police began using tear gas just 15 minutes after crowds formed, launching 299 canisters in total. Eight members of the Lansing branch of the ACLU were on hand to monitor police actions during the 2008 Cedar Fest and afterwards complimented police on how the incident was handled.

At a press conference following the event, Wibert said:

It’s something that’s completely new for us. We’ve never had an incident like this instigated from a web site. As far as I’m concerned, Cedar Fest is over and we’re not going to allow it to happen again. It’s not a tradition that East Lansing or Michigan State University wants to continue. As many trouble makers from last night as we can are going to be convicted and they’re not going to be here next year.

== Sports celebrations ==
With the memory of 2008's Cedar Fest fresh in the minds of Michigan State students, an unofficial Cedar Fest revival occurred Saturday, April 4, 2009 and Monday, April 6, 2009, following the Michigan State men's basketball team's successful run to the Final Four. Crowds of 2,000 and 1,700 (respectively) peacefully celebrated together in the streets outside of Cedar Village with continuous chants of "Go Green, Go White!" and renditions of the Michigan State University Fight Song.Over 80 arrests were made during the Final Four weekend; however, most of these arrests were related to minors possessing alcohol. A total of 11 acts of arson were reported (mostly burnt couches, an MSU tradition); however, no major incidents occurred as most revelers left Cedar Village peacefully after being asked to disperse by the police.

In 2013, students gathered at the Cedar apartments to celebrate MSU's victory in the Big Ten football championship game. After four large fires were fed with various furniture and household items for several hours, police moved in to disperse the revelers.

On March 29, 2015, after MSU advanced to the Final Four by defeating Louisville in the Elite 8 of the NCAA basketball tournament, hundreds of students gathered outside Cedar Village to celebrate. Police were immediately on the scene. Students began throwing dozens of bagels in the air in jubilance and a sweater was burned. Several arrests were made.

== Timeline ==
- Oct 28, 1983: First "official" Cedar Fest; 1,000 attend, 37 arrests
- May 19, 1984: 5,000 attend, no major incidents
- Oct 27, 1984: 5,000 attend, more than 30 arrested
- May 18, 1985: 6,000 attend, 14 arrests, 10 injured, approximately $2000 in damage
- Oct 26, 1985: 4,000 attend, no major incidents
- May 17, 1986: 500 attend, 25 arrests, 22 injured
- Oct 25, 1986: 5,000 attend, 35 arrests, 24 injured
- May 16, 1987: 200 attend, 44 arrests, no damage or serious injuries
- Fall 1987: Permanent injunction makes it illegal to be at a Cedar Fest event in May or October.
- October 1989: While not an official Cedar Fest, 3,000 rioters at Cedar Village Apartments burn furniture, bicycles and a moped, and attack bystanders after MSU's football team loses to the University of Michigan.
- February 1990: A federal appeals court rules that an ordinance allowing police to barricade Cedar Village when officials suspected a party forming was unconstitutional.
- March 27, 1999: Over 10000 rioted in Cedar Village. Numerous cars were overturned and burned included one police car.
- April 5, 2008: 4,000 attend, 52 arrests
- April 6, 2009: 2,000 attend, 10 arrests; mainly peaceful celebration.
- March 29, 2015: Bagels were thrown.
