= Potter Park Zoo =

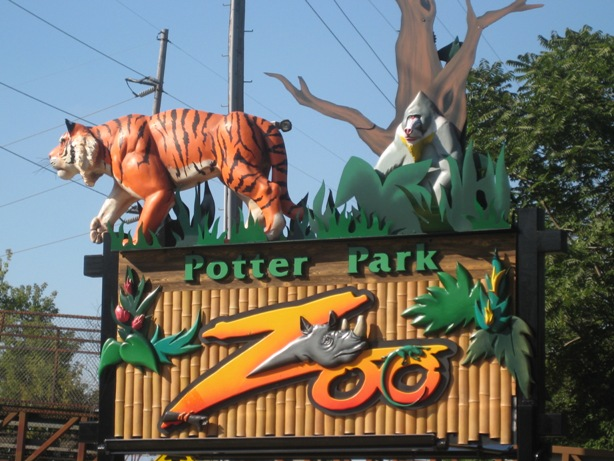
- Zoo entrance sign along Pennsylvania Avenue
- Interactive map of Potter Park Zoo
- 42°43′03.87″N 84°31′42.24″W
- Date opened: 1920
- Location: Lansing, Michigan, United States
- Land area: 102 acres (41.3 ha)
- No. of animals: 350+
- No. of species: 160+
- Annual visitors: 167,000 ▲18%
- Memberships: AZA
- Website: www.potterparkzoo.org

The Potter Park Zoo is a 102-acre (41.3 ha) zoo located in Lansing, Michigan, within Lansing's Potter Park. Its mission is to Inspire people to conserve animals in the natural world. Potter Park Zoo is the oldest public zoo in Michigan and is currently home to over 160 species of animals. The zoo is owned by the City of Lansing, and operated by Ingham County. The zoo participates in the Association of Zoos and Aquariums (AZA) Species Survival Plan (SSP) designed to manage and conserve threatened or endangered animals. The Michigan State University College of Veterinary Medicine partners with the zoo to provide medical care for its animals.

== History ==
=== Early 20th century ===
Lansing's zoo originated in 1912 with the donation of 58 acres (23.5 ha) of land to the city by J. W. and Sarah Potter, a prominent Lansing couple, for Potter Park. The James M. Turner estate donated a herd of elk to Lansing in 1915. The city's supervisor of parks, H. Lee Bancroft, initially moved the elk to nearby Moores Park. The same year Charles J. Davis transferred deer to the park, creating the city's first zoo. Moores Park continued to grow, and eventually the elk and deer, along with a bear, two raccoons, and other native animals, were moved to the more spacious Potter Park in 1920. Potter Park was dedicated on July 5, 1915, and added 27 acres (11 ha) more land in 1917. With Potter Park Zoo's official opening in 1920, it became Michigan's first public zoo. The next year a pavilion was completed, one of the zoo's first buildings. Lansing resident Sophie Turner donated 17 acres (6.9 ha) to Potter Park Zoo, increasing the park's size to 102 acres (41 ha).

The Bird and Reptile House was completed in 1929; the following year the Lion House opened. Monkey Island, (converted to a bighorn sheep exhibit in the 1990s, and now removed as of 2010), was constructed by the Works Progress Administration in 1936. The aviary was constructed in 1941, with renovations completed in 1982. The barnyard and petting zoo were added in 1949. The zoo's first African lion, Pete, who lived there for twenty years, died in 1947. The zoo's Bengal tiger, Bobo, died in 1949. By the 1950s, Potter Park Zoo had 138 mammals and 267 birds. Among these were several monkey species, including rhesus, ringtail, spider, and African green monkeys. One of the most popular animals at the zoo during this time was Herman, a Mexican burro, whom the zoo acquired from the Shrine Circus in 1951.

=== 1960s-1990s ===
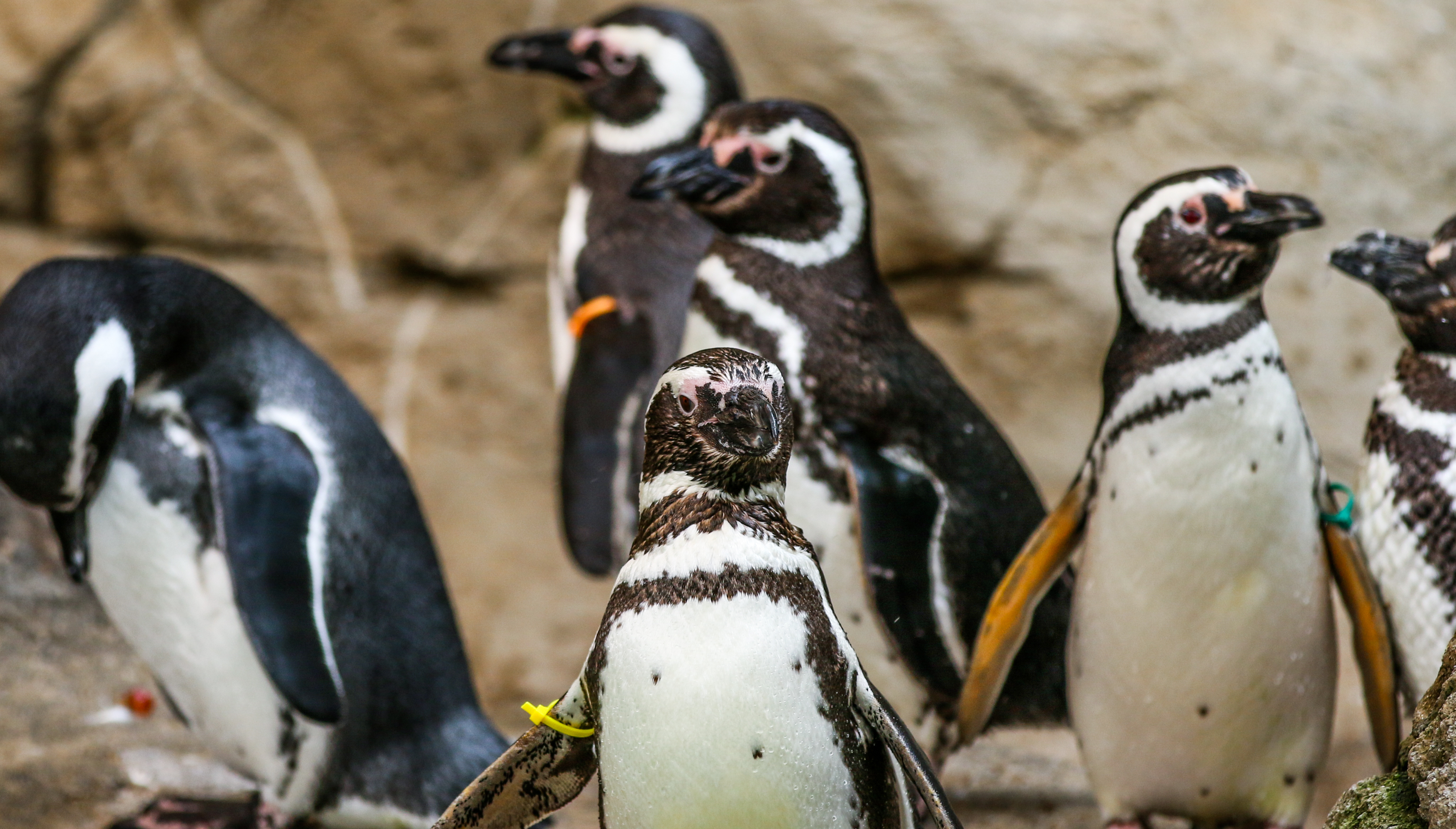
Potter Park Zoo's Magellanic penguins

The zoo grew for the decades afterward until the late 1960s when the zoo began a decline from municipal neglect. However, in 1969, Jim Hough, a then-columnist of the Lansing State Journal, used his column to bring together concerned citizens and local-area residents to raise money to help revitalize the zoo. The same year, the Friends of the Zoo Society was formed. Their fundraising paid off when they earned enough money to purchase the zoo's first elephant, Bingo, in 1972 for $4,453. In 1974, a railroad was constructed, offering rides for 25¢.

An outdoor Magellanic penguin exhibit, with a canopy, was added to Potter Park Zoo in 1985. In 1986, Potter Park Zoo received American Association of Zoos and Aquariums (AZA) accreditation, at the time one of the smallest zoos in the country to achieve that status. AZA accreditation allows the zoo to house and care for endangered species. Also that year, the Friends of the Zoo Society became the Potter Park Zoological Society, and incorporated as an organization. The zoo's Lion House was extensively renovated in 1989 and became known as the Feline and Primate Building. In 1992, rare triplet Amur (Siberian) tiger cubs were born at the zoo.

=== 2000s ===
Amur (Siberian) tiger at Potter Park Zoo

The zoo's Exploration and Discovery Center for Education opened in 2000. The facility includes classrooms, an educational exhibit room for wildlife presentations, the Safari Room for meetings, and offices for the Potter Park Zoo Society and its volunteers. In 2003, Ivan, the zoo's 20-year-old Amur tiger, died. He was the oldest living Amur tiger in North America. In 2005, endangered tiger cubs were born at Potter Park Zoo; later, they were featured on NBC's Today Show. Also that year, the River Otter and Arctic Fox exhibits opened.

In April 2006, Lansing Mayor, Virg Bernero, submitted a request to the Ingham County Board of Commissioners to put on the ballot in November of that year a proposal to hand over operation and maintenance of Potter Park and Potter Park Zoo to Ingham County. The county board formed a city/council zoo task force, and the result of that was an agreement between the two entities that the City of Lansing would lease the zoo and park to Ingham County under the condition that an attached millage of $3.2 million was passed by county residents. The millage passed on November 2, 2006.

Potter Park Zoo's two black rhinos, Spike and Ebony, died in February and April 2008, respectively. The zoo announced preliminary plans for a new, expanded eastern black rhinoceros exhibit on January 7, 2009. The $1.5 million renovation includes an expanded rhino building, doubling the size of the rhino yard with shade, mud, and water hole areas, and a canopied viewing area for visitors, designed to provide a more natural habitat for the animals. Zookeeper, Jack Hanna, appeared at Potter Park Zoo in April 2009 to support the expansion project. In 2009, the Wings from Down Under aviary opened, allowing guests to interact with more than 600 Australian birds.

=== 2010s ===
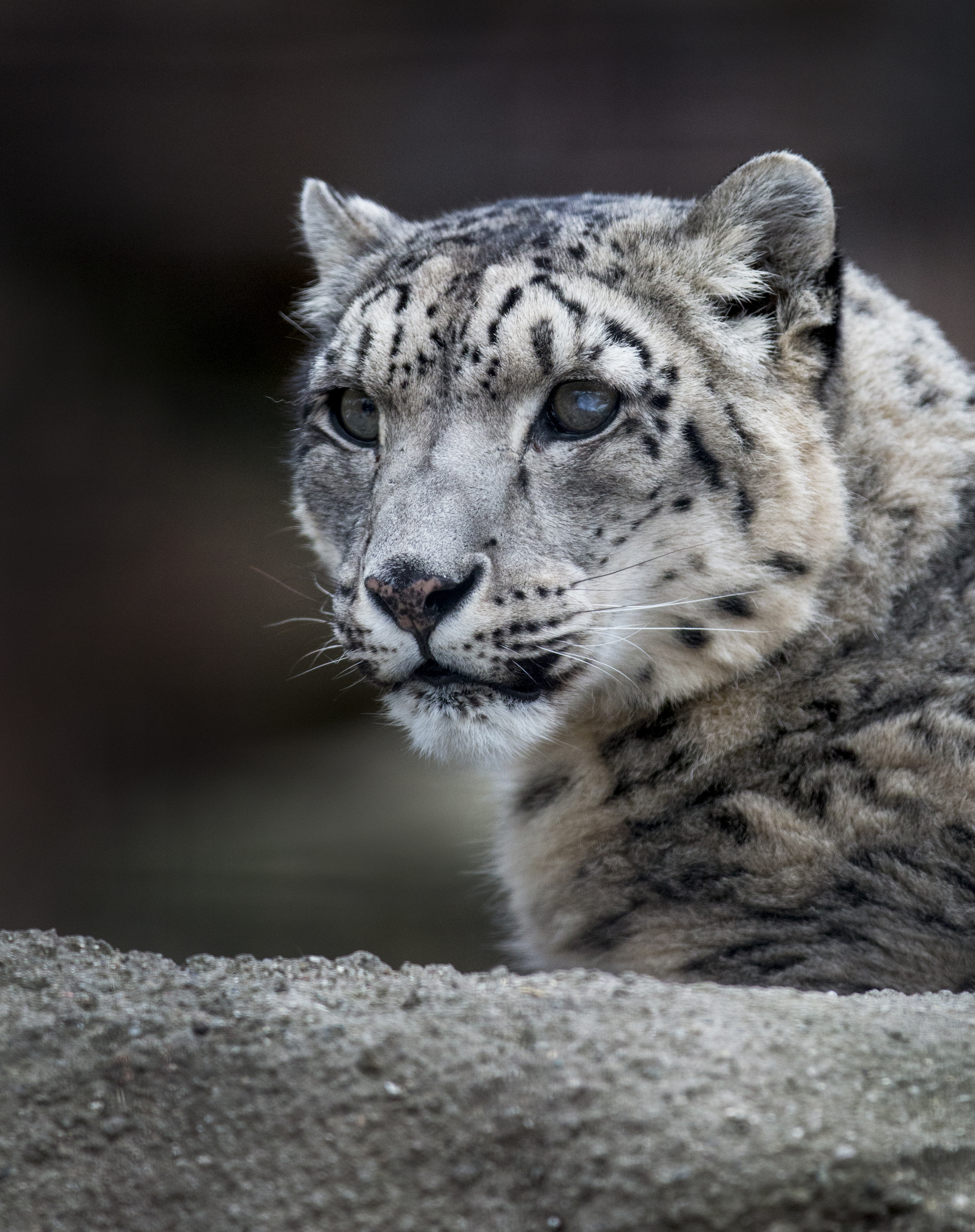
Snow leopard at the zoo

In March 2010, Potter Park Zoo artificially inseminated a female snow leopard, believed to be the world first successful procedure without surgery or anesthesia. The zoo's 11-year-old female, Serena, was matched with Kaz, a male from the Grand Rapids John Ball Zoo. Potter Park's 28-year-old mandrill, Gladys, died in April 2010. The primate first arrived at the zoo in 1989. In August 2010, Potter Park Zoo became one of 19 international locations to be accredited with a postdoctoral veterinary residency program by the American College of Zoological Medicine. A 1,060 square feet (98 m^{2}) expanded Eurasian eagle-owl exhibit reopened in September. A mandrill was born at the zoo in November 2010, bringing the zoo's total to four. In December 2010, the zoo acquired a second snow leopard, Ramir, a 13-year-old from the Sacramento Zoo, as part of the Association of Zoos and Aquariums Species Survival Plan (But Ramir died at least a year later). The same month, a 15-year-old Bactrian camel, Newton, had to be euthanized due to arthritis.

In September 2011, three Amur tiger cubs were born (all were female), increasing the zoo's tiger population to five. The zoo's 22-year-old African lion, Amboseli – one of the oldest lions in captivity worldwide – died in December. Two new female lions arrived at the zoo to join the zoo's existing male lion, Dakota. In April 2012, a critically endangered eastern bongo was born at Potter Park, increasing the number at the zoo to four. In the spring of 2013, the zoo's aging coral reef exhibit was removed to be replaced with an additional classroom, and three river otter pups were added to the zoo, bringing the population to five. Two of the pups were orphans moved from the Alexandria Zoo in Louisiana.

In June of 2011, two eastern black rhinos, Jello and Doppsee, arrived at the zoo in preparation for the opening of a new 8,000 square feet (743 m^{2}) exhibit that would later open in October of that year. On December 24, 2019, the zoo welcomed the birth of Jaali (pronounced “Jolly”) a male black rhino, who was the first of his species to be born in the zoo’s 100-year history.

On October 20, 2021, Jaali would leave Potter Park for the Living Desert Zoo and Gardens in California, leaving the zoo with his parents Phineus and Doppsee.

== Current and future development ==
Potter Park Zoo's most recent master plan was released in January 2010. In the master plan, goals for the zoo include:

- an emphasis on the natural habit of the nearby Red Cedar River
- a focus on ecology and wildlife of Michigan and other areas of the world with similar ecosystems, with a recurring theme about Lakes.
- an improved visitor experience through better signage and a sense of immersion in the animals' natural habitats

== Annual events ==
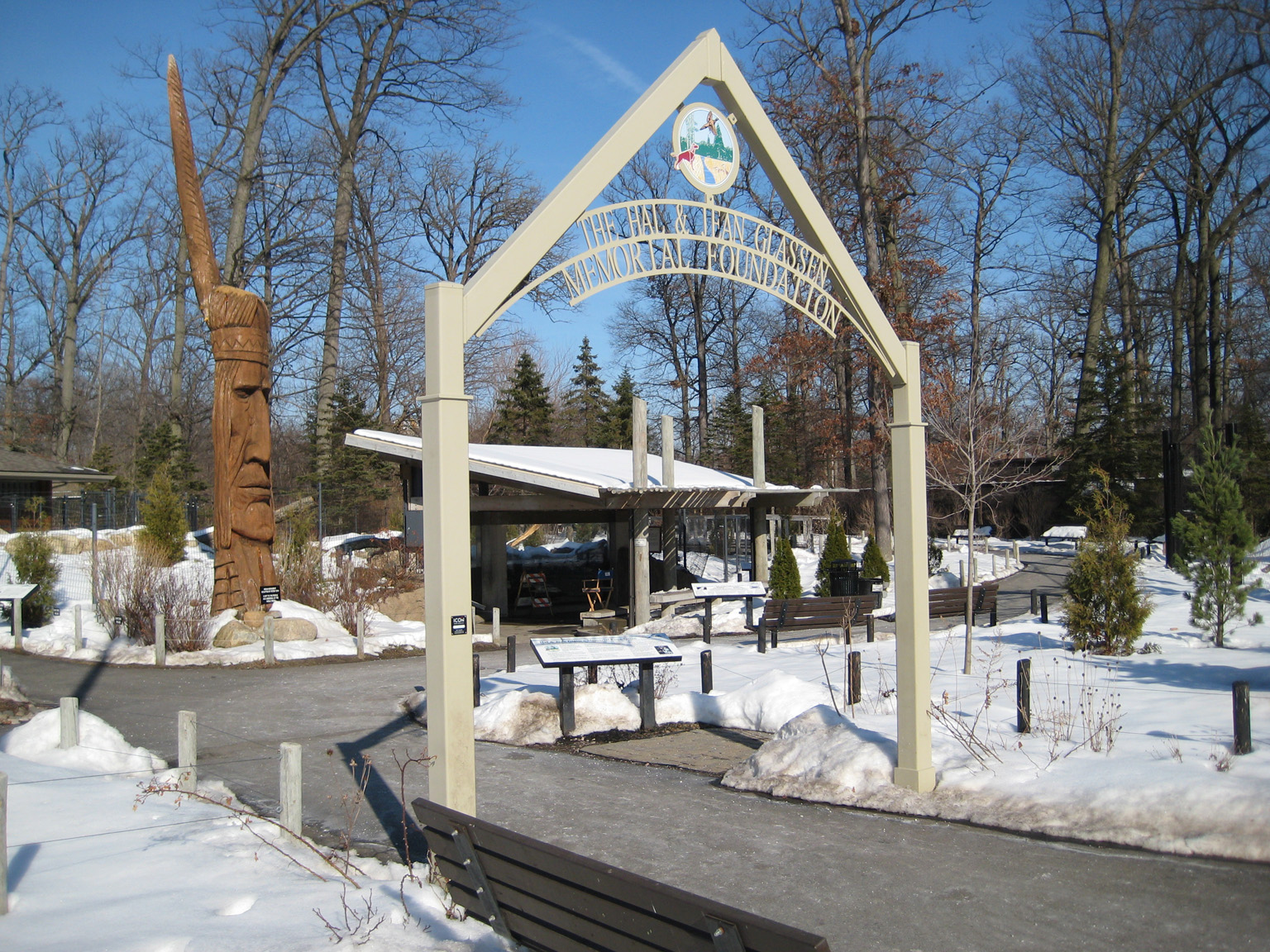
Potter Park Zoo in winter

- Trees are planted at Potter Park Zoo during its annual Arbor Day celebration. Elementary students from across mid-Michigan attend the event.
- On Mother's Day, the zoo offers children's projects, animal enrichment programs, live animal presentations, and free carnations for mothers. Mothers, fathers, and grandparents receive free admission to the zoo on their respective holidays as well.
- In mid-July, L&L Zoo Days offers reduced admission and shuttle service to the zoo, food sampling, and face painting.
- Boo at the Zoo is an annual Halloween celebration at the zoo. The weekend-long event is geared for children.
- The Wonderland of Lights at Potter Park Zoo runs from late November to late December. The event features Holiday carolers, musical performances, and Christmas light displays. In early December, children can have Breakfast with Santa and Mrs. Claus at the zoo.
- During the summer months, the zoo hosts Keeper Talks, an opportunity for visitors to hear interesting stories and learn more about the zoo.

== Animals and exhibits ==
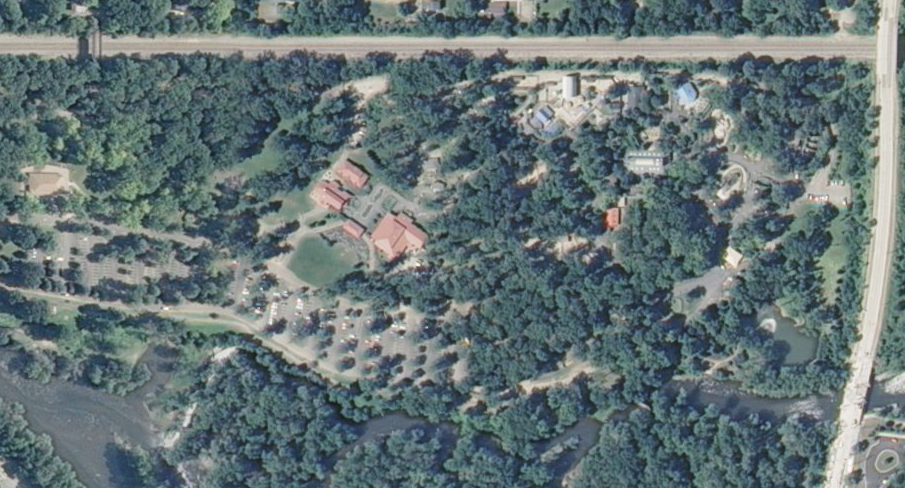
An April 2007 USGS aerial photograph of Potter Park Zoo

The Potter Park Zoo's Feline and Primate Building houses three Amur (Siberian) tigers, an African lion, a snow leopard, lemurs, mandrills, and endangered tamarin monkeys. The Bird and Reptile House features a wide variety of reptiles such as boas, gila monsters, black-and-white tegu, and emerald tree boas, and birds such as macaws, eastern screech owls, kookaburras, and endangered Bali mynas.

Near the entrance to the zoo is the Exploration and Discovery Center for Education. Children can pet and, in some cases, feed the animals at the barnyard and petting zoo. Located there are goats, burros, llamas, yaks, pigs, tortoises, and rabbits.

Wings from Down Under opened in the spring of 2009. Visitors can feed and interact with over 600 grass parakeets, cockatiels, and eastern rosellas. The exhibit is open seasonally. Camel rides and pony rides are available during warmer months.

There are gardens and a pond with ducks, geese, and swans. Other animals at the zoo include kangaroos, penguins, river otters, eastern bongos, bald eagles, eastern black rhinoceros, gray wolves, red pandas, Arctic foxes, bat-eared foxes, meerkats, porcupines, banded mongooses, and southern ground hornbills. In early 2014, a young orphan moose named Willow arrived.

A gift shop is located near the front of the zoo. An outdoor restaurant is located at the back end of the zoo.

== Photo gallery ==

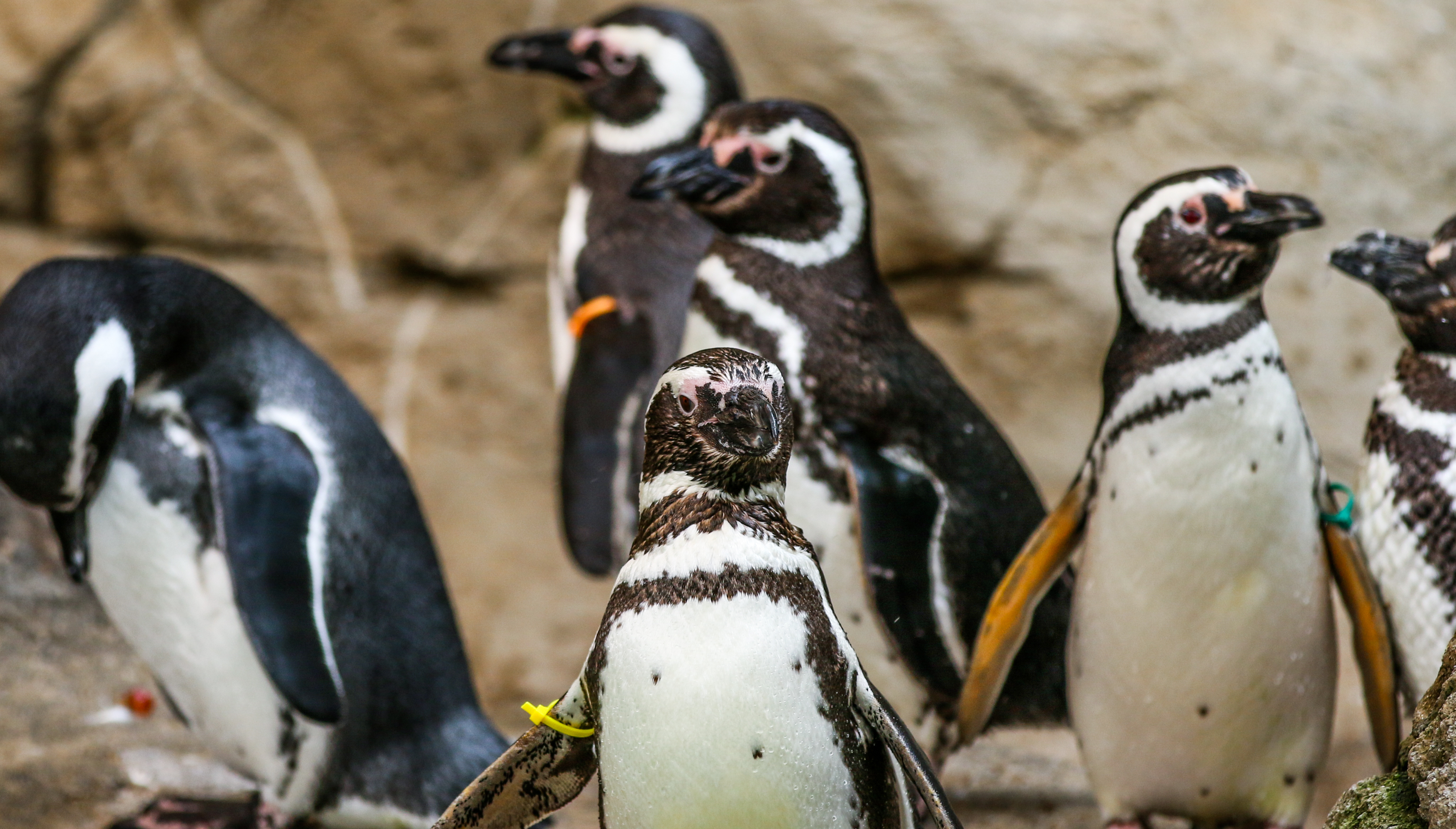

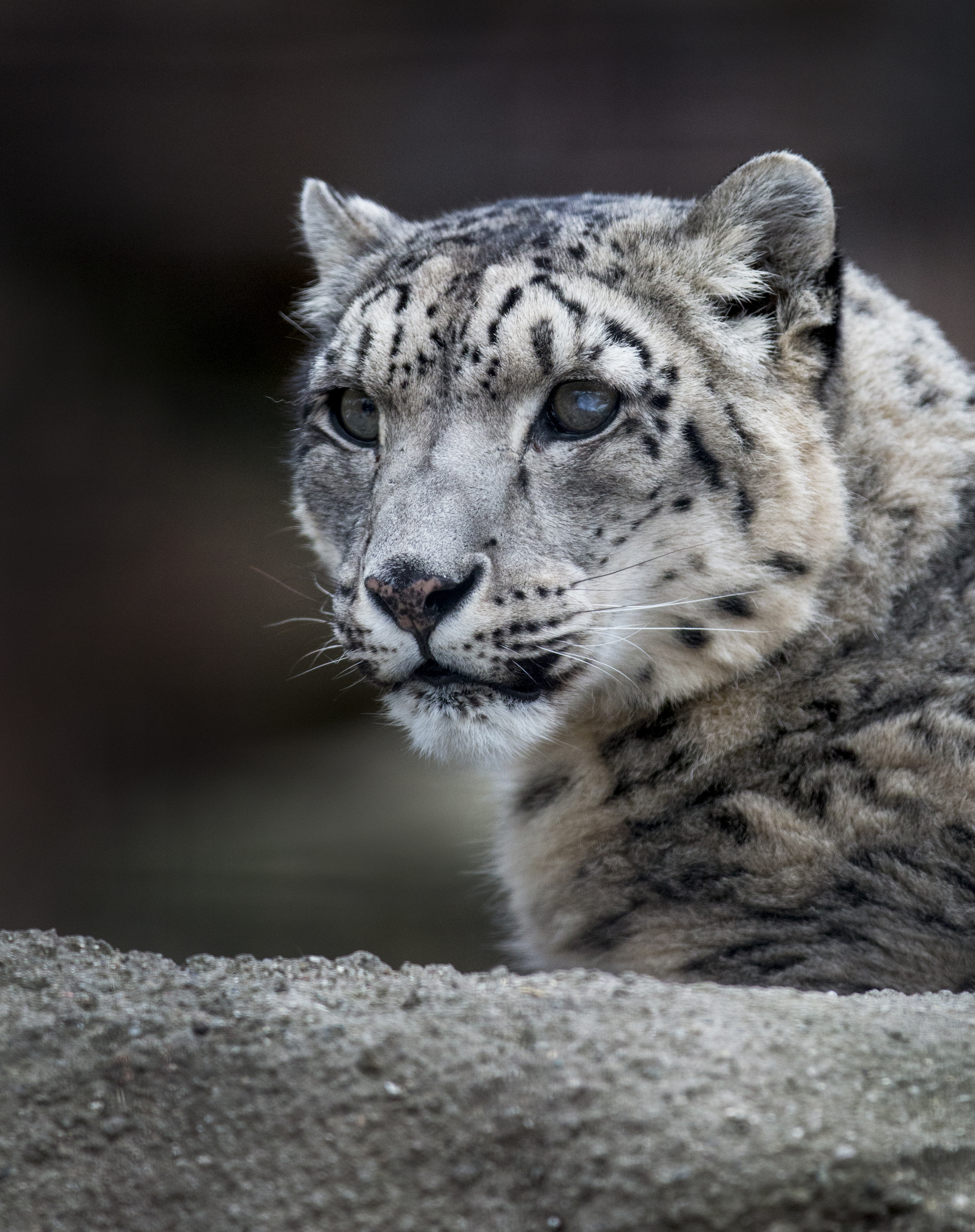

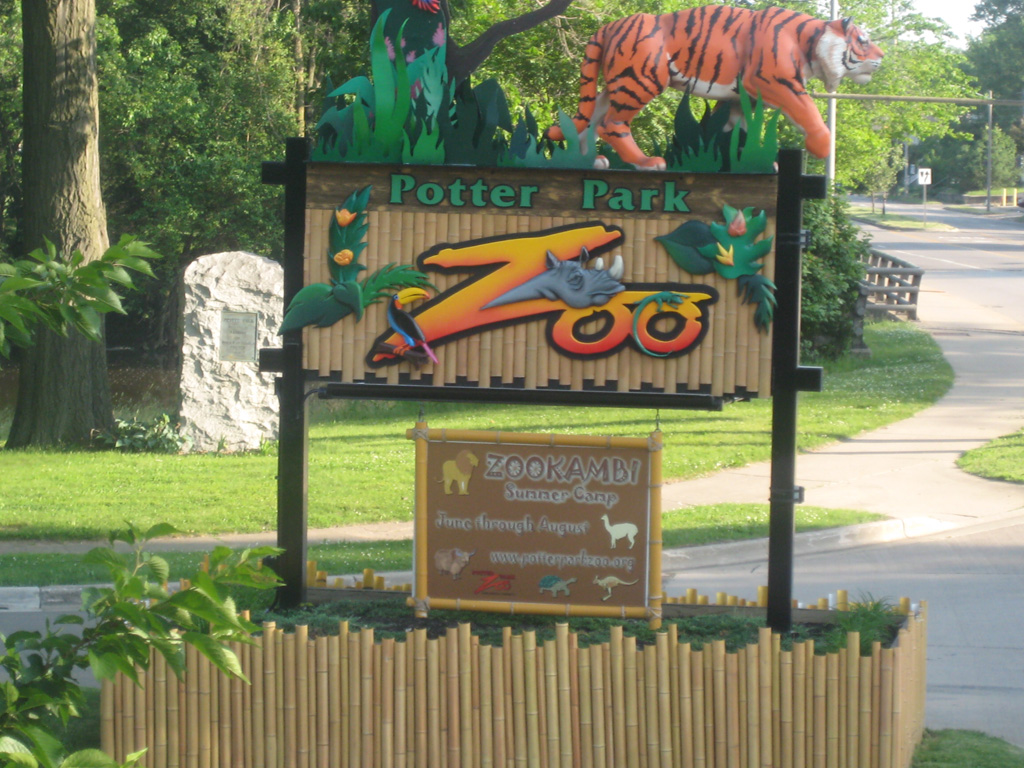
Potter Park Zoo entrance sign from Lansing River Trail

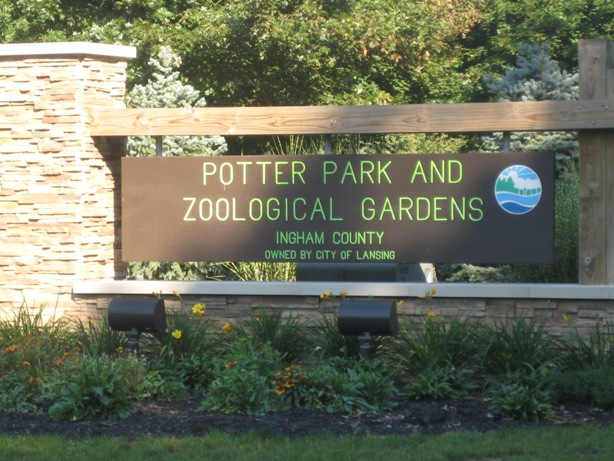
Potter Park and Zoological Gardens sign along the entrance drive to the zoo

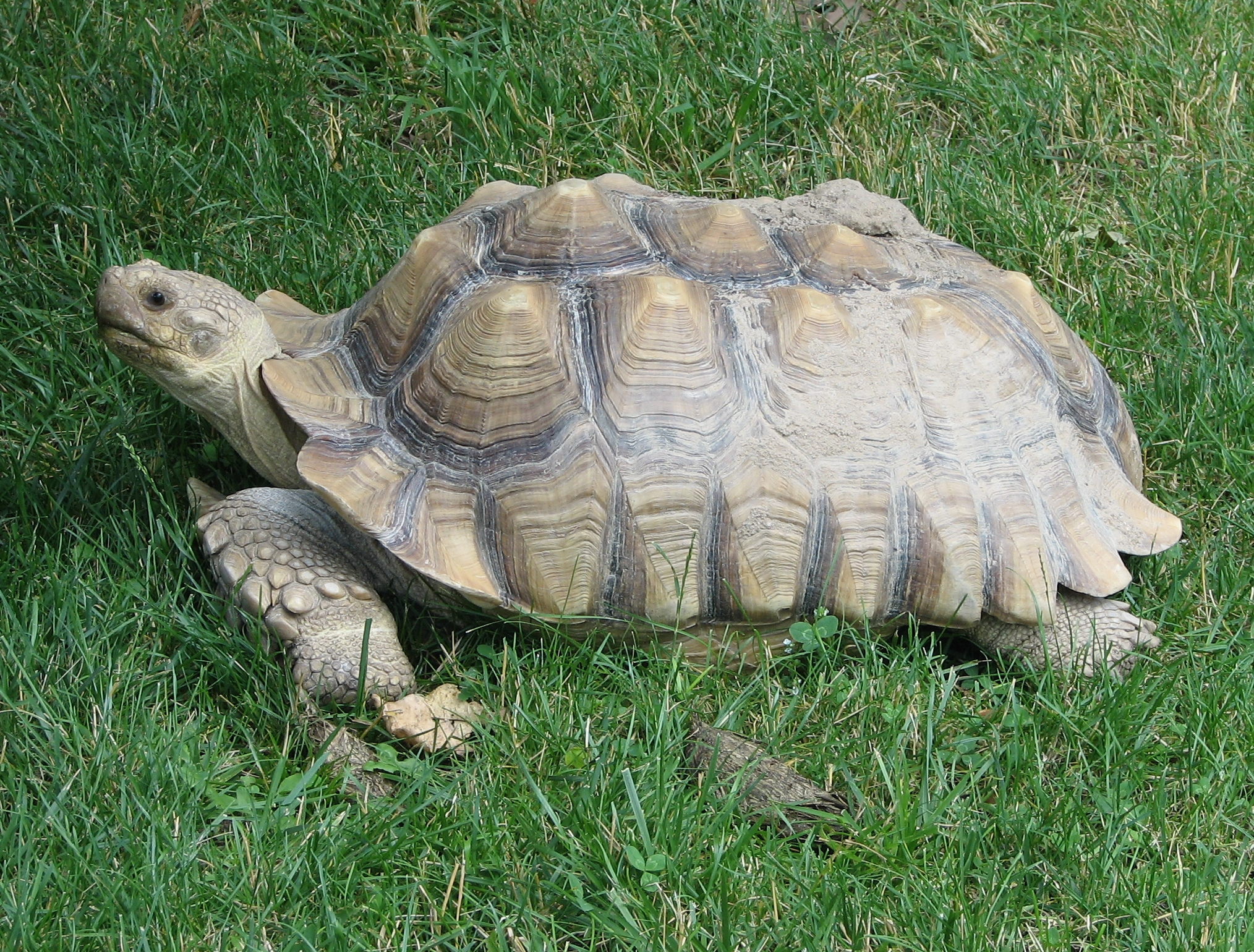
African spurred tortoise at Potter Park Zoo

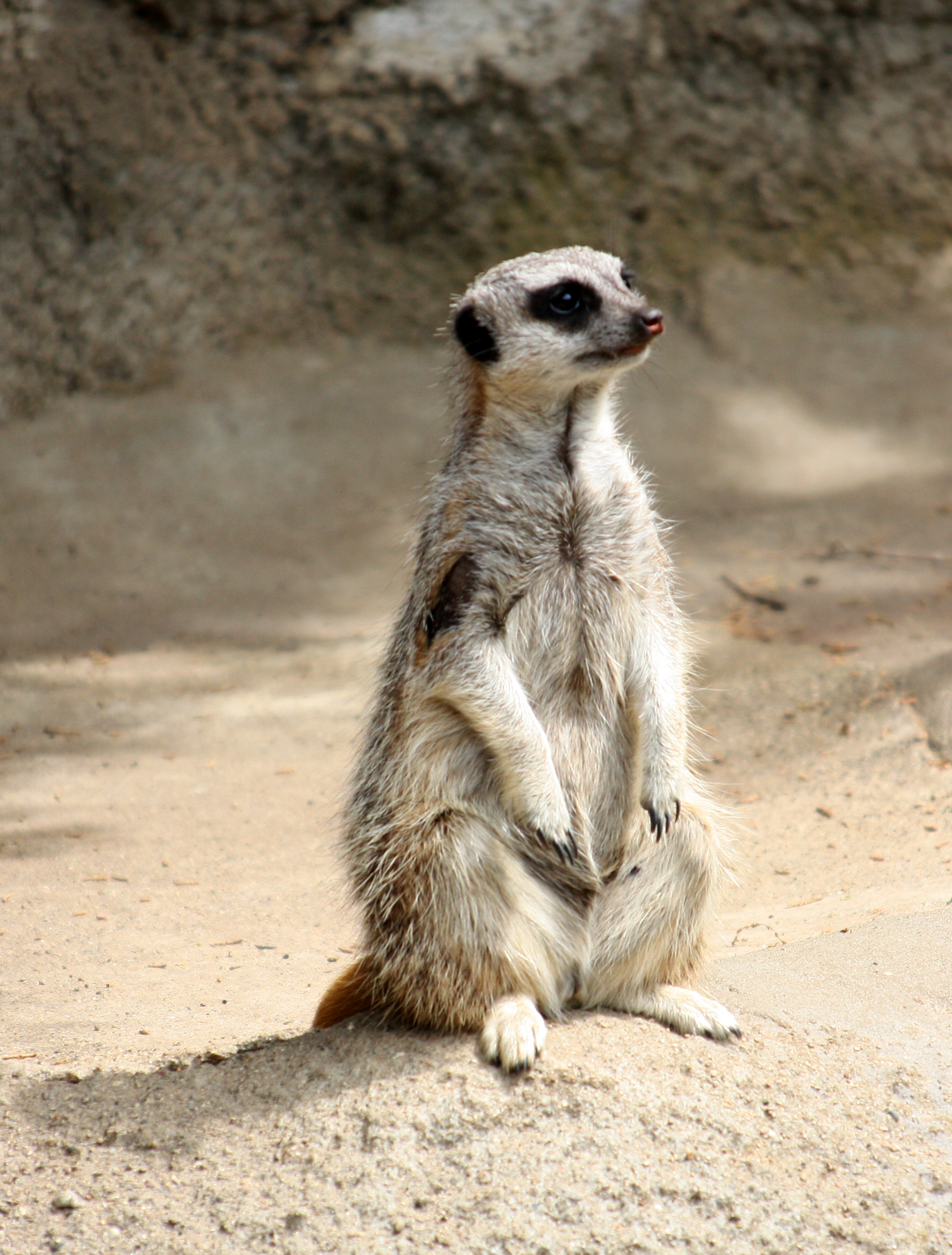

== See also ==
- Lansing, Michigan Culture
