= (SCENE) Metrospace =

Alternative arts space in East Lansing, Michigan

Coordinates: 42.731981°N 84.482153°W

(Scene) Metrospace is an alternative arts space located in downtown East Lansing, Michigan, featuring a variety of contemporary artworks. (Scene) also hosts a wide variety of musical performances by local and national artists. It is a project created in response to Governor Jennifer Granholm's Cool Cities Initiative.

(Scene) is free and open to the public, unless a nominal cost is determined for a special performance. Artists working in any mixed media are encouraged to submit exhibition proposals. It is now operated by the Department of Art, Art History, and Design at Michigan State University.

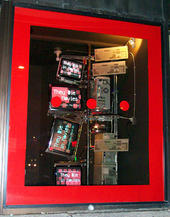
Photo by Ande Johnston

== History ==
Founded in May 2004, '(Scene)' is a multidisciplinary arts endeavor aimed to enhance and support downtown East Lansing and the region by programming a wide range of creative, new, and experimental arts activities, exhibits and performances in the visual arts, music, film/video, literature, theater, dance, performance and multidisciplinary art forms. '(Scene)' aims to present dynamic programming to the public and to provide committed emerging artists and artists from across the country with the opportunity to exhibit and highlight work that may not otherwise have a venue in the area.

(Scene) was originally opened at 303 Abbott Street, but the site was demolished. In May 2007 (Scene) moved to a new space at 110 Charles Street—a place known to locals as "under the colorful parking structure".
