= Lansing City Market =

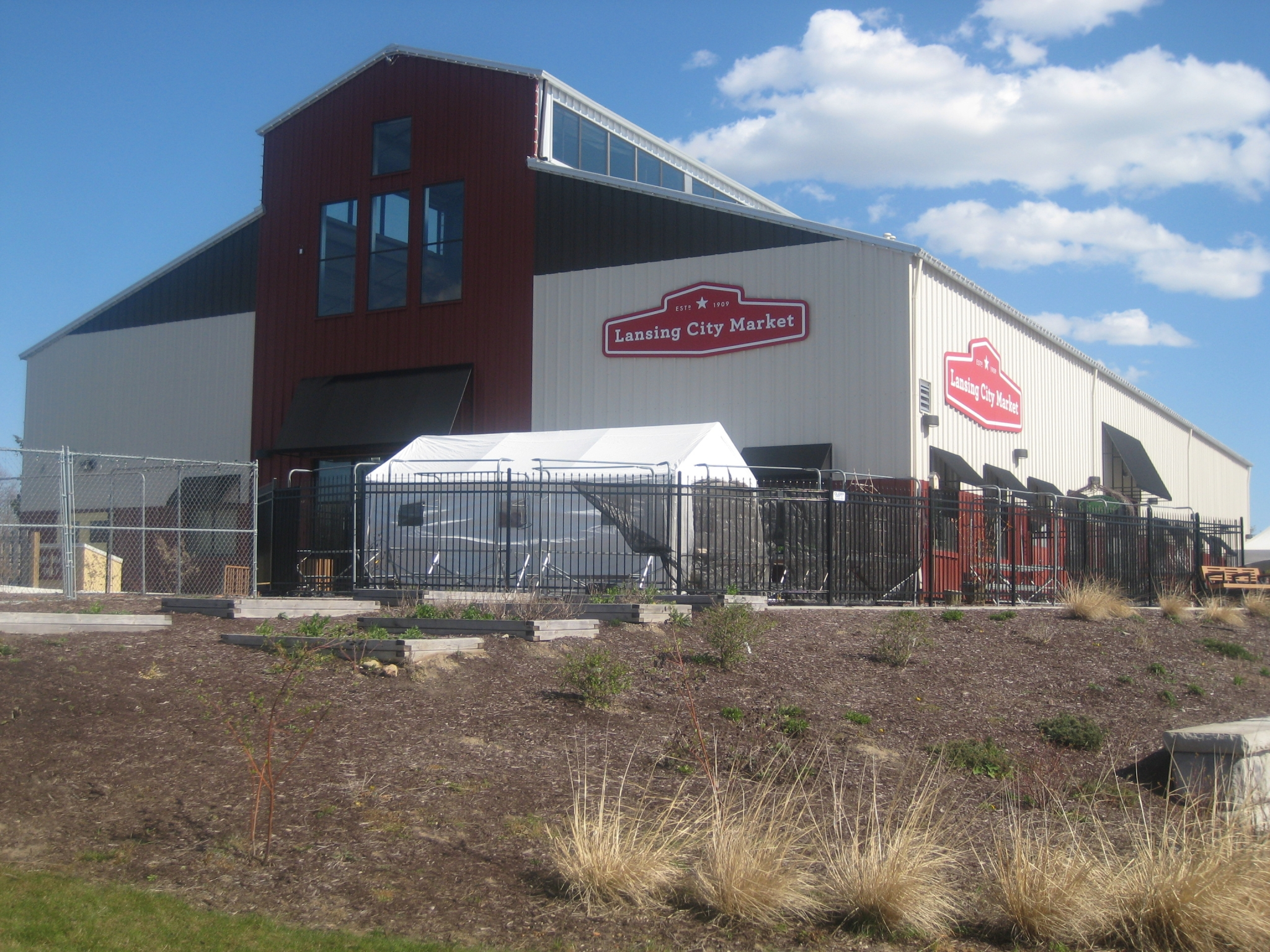
- Lansing City Market along River Trail
- Location: Lansing, Michigan, United States
- Coordinates: 42°44′8.7″N 84°32′52.3″W
- Address: 325 City Market Drive
- Opened: 2010
- Closed: 2019
- Manager: Lansing Entertainment & Public Facilities Authority
- Num. of stores: 0 vendors
- Floor area: 11,000 square feet (1,022 m^{2})
- Floors: 1

The Lansing City Market was an urban city market located in downtown Lansing, Michigan. The market is located along the Grand River (Michigan) and Lansing River Trail, and is west of Cooley Law School Stadium. The current $1.6 million structure opened in January 2010. Merchant space ranges from 80 square feet (7 m^{2}) to over 800 square feet (74 m^{2}).

== History ==
The original Lansing City Market opened in 1909 at an adjacent site north of the current city market. The building was demolished in April 2010 to allow room for a new mixed-use development.

An episode of Food Network's Food Court Wars was taped at the City Market on March 19, 2014.

Lansing City Market closed in October 2019. Lansing Shuffle, a music venue and food court with shuffleboard courts, opened in the building in January 2023.

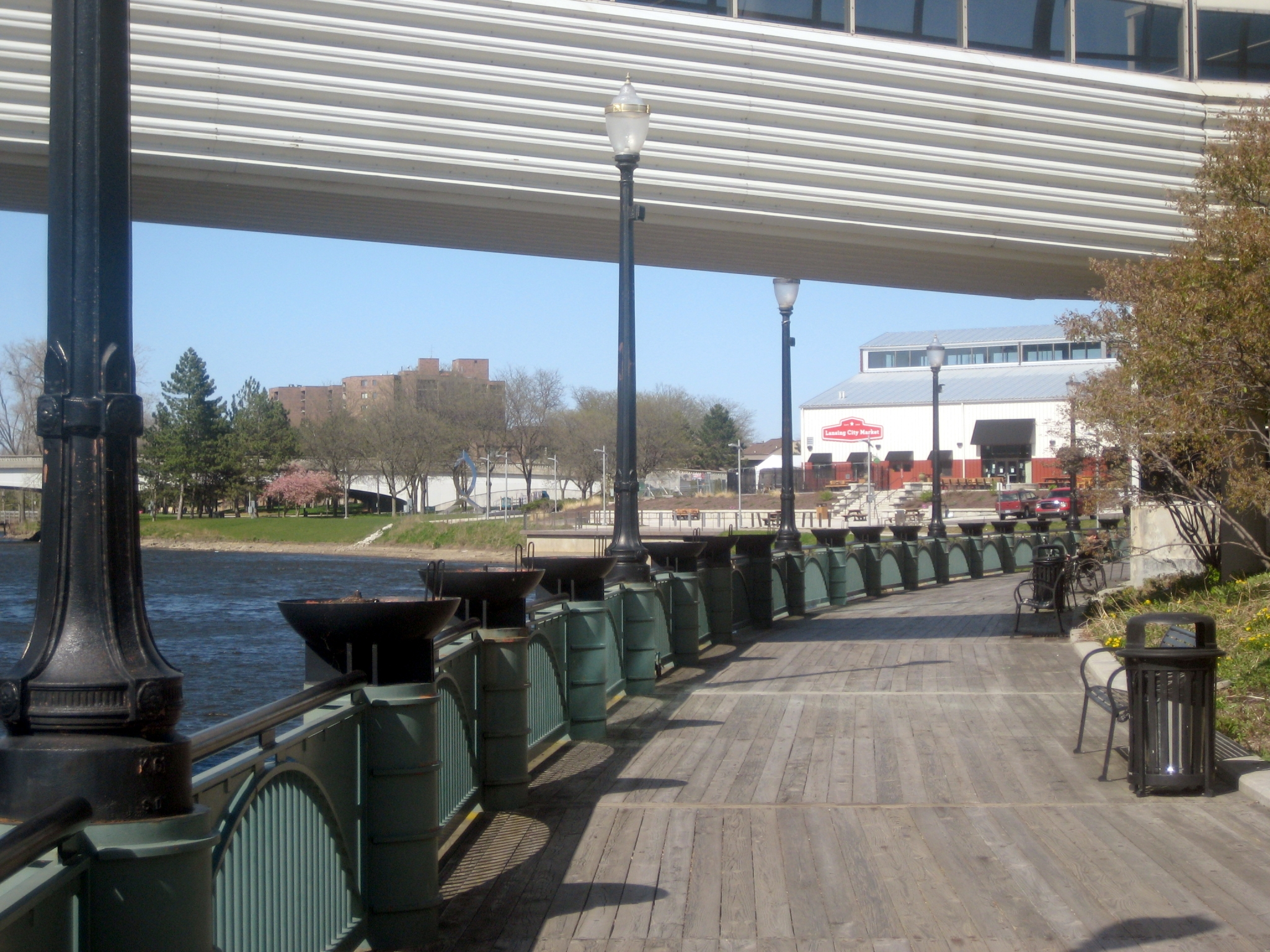
Lansing City Market along
Grand River
