= Wally Pleasant =

American singer-songwriter

Wally Pleasant is an American musician from Michigan. He plays humorous songs based on folk music and 1950s–60s rock and roll influences. Throughout the 1990s he was a fixture in the East Lansing indie-rock scene, alongside fellow local acts like The Verve Pipe.

== Career ==
Born Wally Bullard in Detroit, Pleasant did not become a serious guitarist until college. While majoring in political science at Michigan State University's James Madison College, he performed at various Lansing-area open mic nights, gaining significant local popularity.

A successful homemade cassette tape in the late 1980s led him to release a total of six CDs, the first five on his own record label Miranda Records. His classic 1992 "Songs About Stuff" LP featured fan favorites like "Small Time Drug Dealer" and "Psycho Roommate."

In 1996, Pleasant performed before incumbent-President Bill Clinton's speech during his re-election campaign when he visited East Lansing.

Pleasant has performed throughout the United States over the years, especially in areas where large numbers of MSU Spartan alumni have settled. For much of the 1990s, he was a full-time musician, but has scaled back his schedule in recent years due to personal and family concerns.

He has been a featured artist on the Dr. Demento radio show with songs like "The Day Ted Nugent Killed All the Animals". Nugent had Pleasant perform this song on Detroit radio in the mid-1990s.

Primarily a solo artist, Pleasant performed occasionally in the 1990s with individual sidemen (electric guitarists, bassists) and with a four-piece band, The Happy Neighborhood. In 2003 and 2004 Pleasant also played with a backup band, Appearing as "Wally Pleasant and Carl". Carl was composed of former Turdcutter band members Eric Sweeney (drums) and David Wellbaum (bass).

In a 1997 Daily Vault review of Pleasant's 1992 college radio favorite Songs About Stuff, Sean McCarthy wrote:

If one artist of the 90s is to be condemned to college radio, it would be Wally Pleasant. Pavement, your hit is coming. Reverend Horton Heat... the swing/ska trend HAS to pick you up by your next album. But Pleasant is college rock personified ... Songs About Stuff ... is a purchase that is almost essential for any college rock fan. Too jaded and introspective to be lumped together in the geek-humor rock genre and too much of a sense of humor to lump him in the Pavement crowd, Pleasant is a treasure.

Wally's most recent work includes writing and performing the music for Biggby's most recent commercial spots, winning an Emmy for his work in 2011.

2004's Music For Nerds & Perverts was released on Nashville, Tennessee-based Spat! Records. His most recent LP, "Exile in Wally Street" followed in 2011.

Wally is married and currently lives in Charlotte, Michigan.

== Discography ==
=== Albums ===
- Songs About Stuff – 1992
- Welcome to Pleasantville 1993
- Houses of the Holy Moly – 1994
- Wally World – 1996
- Hoedown – 2000
- Music for Nerds and Perverts – 2004
- Happy Hour – 2018
- Exile on Wally Street – 2011 (projected, still timely albeit revised release date)
