= National Register of Historic Places listings in Ingham County, Michigan =

Location of Ingham County in Michigan

This is a list of the National Register of Historic Places listings in Ingham County, Michigan.

This is intended to be a complete list of the properties and districts on the National Register of Historic Places in Ingham County, Michigan, United States. The locations of National Register properties and districts for which the latitude and longitude coordinates are included below, may be seen in an online map.

There are 55 properties and districts listed on the National Register in the county, including 1 National Historic Landmark.

This National Park Service list is complete through NPS recent listings posted August 21, 2026.

== Current listings ==
| | Name on the Register | Image | Date listed | Location | City or town | Description |
|---|---|---|---|---|---|---|
| 1 | Arbaugh's Department Store Building | Arbaugh's Department Store Building | July 20, 2007 (#07000748) | 401 S. Washington; 42°43′46″N 84°33′07″W | Lansing | |
| 2 | Ash Street-Sycamore Creek Bridge | Ash Street-Sycamore Creek Bridge | January 14, 2000 (#99001673) | M-36 over Sycamore Creek; 42°34′45″N 84°26′51″W | Mason | |
| 3 | Bailey Buildings | Bailey Buildings | April 8, 2021 (#100006364) | 513 West Ionia St. 42°44′09″N 84°33′33″W | Lansing | |
| 4 | Barnes Avenue School | Barnes Avenue School | November 30, 2023 (#100008811) | 1028 West Barnes Ave. 42°42′55″N 84°34′00″W | Lansing | |
| 5 | Brown-Price House | Brown-Price House | March 22, 1984 (#84001429) | 1003 N. Washington Ave. 42°44′42″N 84°33′09″W | Lansing | |
| 6 | Capital Bank Tower | Capital Bank Tower | December 6, 2005 (#05001357) | 124 W. Allegan St. 42°43′58″N 84°33′11″W | Lansing | Now known as Boji Tower |
| 7 | Central Methodist Episcopal Church | Central Methodist Episcopal Church | September 17, 1980 (#80001864) | 215 N. Capitol Ave. 42°44′06″N 84°33′16″W | Lansing | |
| 8 | Central School | Central School | April 10, 1986 (#86000709) | 325 W. Grand River Ave. 42°44′11″N 84°29′20″W | East Lansing | |
| 9 | Courthouse Square Historic District | Courthouse Square Historic District | June 6, 1985 (#85001243) | Bounded by Park, E. Columbia, Rodgers and South; 42°34′43″N 84°26′31″W | Mason | |
| 10 | Dodge Mansion | Dodge Mansion | September 14, 1972 (#72000621) | 106 E. North St. 42°45′03″N 84°33′08″W | Lansing | |
| 11 | Emery Houses | Emery Houses | December 10, 1993 (#93001409) | 320-322 and 326-328 W. Ottawa; 42°44′05″N 84°33′25″W | Lansing | |
| 12 | Eustace Hall† | Eustace Hall† | September 3, 1971 (#71000395) | 470 W. Circle Dr. 42°43′57″N 84°28′47″W | East Lansing | |
| 13 | Federal Building | Federal Building | September 17, 1980 (#80001865) | 315 W. Allegan St. 42°43′55″N 84°33′23″W | Lansing | |
| 14 | First Baptist Church | First Baptist Church | September 17, 1980 (#80001866) | 227 N. Capitol Ave. 42°44′08″N 84°33′16″W | Lansing | |
| 15 | Franklin Avenue Presbyterian Church | Franklin Avenue Presbyterian Church | May 27, 1988 (#88000564) | 108 W. Grand River Ave. 42°44′53″N 84°33′08″W | Lansing | |
| 16 | Walter H. French Junior High School | Walter H. French Junior High School | December 30, 2014 (#14001097) | 1900 S. Cedar St. 42°42′40″N 84°32′54″W | Lansing | |
| 17 | Genesee Street School | Genesee Street School | April 7, 2014 (#14000124) | 835 W. Genesee St. 42°44′19″N 84°33′49″W | Lansing | |
| 18 | Goetsch-Winckler House | Goetsch-Winckler House | December 13, 1995 (#95001423) | 2410 Hulett Rd., Meridian Township; 42°42′29″N 84°26′21″W | Okemos | |
| 19 | Grand Trunk Western Rail Station/Lansing Depot | Grand Trunk Western Rail Station/Lansing Depot | July 3, 1980 (#80004605) | 1203 S. Washington Ave. 42°43′10″N 84°33′05″W | Lansing | |
| 20 | Ingham County Courthouse | Ingham County Courthouse | December 13, 1971 (#71000397) | 315 S. Jefferson St. 42°34′47″N 84°26′33″W | Mason | |
| 21 | J.W. Knapp Company Building | J.W. Knapp Company Building | May 21, 1983 (#83000851) | 300 S. Washington Ave. 42°43′52″N 84°33′10″W | Lansing | |
| 22 | Lansing Artillery Michigan National Guard Armory | Lansing Artillery Michigan National Guard Armory | December 13, 2010 (#10001025) | 330 Marshall St. 42°44′14″N 84°31′31″W | Lansing | |
| 23 | Lansing Downtown Historic District | Lansing Downtown Historic District | July 22, 2009 (#09000551) | N. and S. Washington, Grand, N. and S. Capitol, Michigan Ave., Allegan, Washtenaw, Kalamazoo, Lenawee, and Townsend; 42°43′53″N 84°33′11″W | Lansing | |
| 24 | Lansing Woman's Club Building | Lansing Woman's Club Building | September 17, 1980 (#80001867) | 118 W. Ottawa St. 42°44′05″N 84°33′11″W | Lansing | |
| 25 | Maple Grove Cemetery | Maple Grove Cemetery | June 6, 1985 (#85001237) | W. Columbia St. 42°35′03″N 84°26′44″W | Mason | |
| 26 | Masonic Temple Building | Masonic Temple Building | March 29, 1999 (#98001083) | 314 M.A.C. Ave. 42°44′10″N 84°28′49″W | East Lansing | |
| 27 | Masonic Temple Building | Masonic Temple Building | September 17, 1980 (#80001868) | 217 S. Capitol Ave. 42°43′55″N 84°33′12″W | Lansing | |
| 28 | Merrylees-Post House | Merrylees-Post House | June 6, 1985 (#85001238) | 519 W. Ash St. 42°34′44″N 84°27′04″W | Mason | |
| 29 | Michigan Central Railroad Mason Depot | Michigan Central Railroad Mason Depot | June 6, 1985 (#85001239) | 111 N. Mason St. 42°34′58″N 84°26′55″W | Mason | |
| 30 | Michigan Millers Mutual Fire Insurance Company Building | Michigan Millers Mutual Fire Insurance Company Building | September 17, 1980 (#80001869) | 120-122 W. Ottawa St. 42°44′05″N 84°33′12″W | Lansing | |
| 31 | Michigan School for the Blind | Michigan School for the Blind | July 26, 2018 (#100002714) | 715 W. Willow St. 42°44′54″N 84°33′53″W | Lansing | |
| 32 | Michigan State Capitol | Michigan State Capitol | January 25, 1971 (#71000396) | Capitol and Michigan Aves. 42°44′01″N 84°33′20″W | Lansing | |
| 33 | Michigan State Medical Society Building | Michigan State Medical Society Building | November 30, 2011 (#11000864) | 120 W. Saginaw St. 42°44′49″N 84°29′05″W | East Lansing | |
| 34 | Darius B. Moon House | Darius B. Moon House | November 30, 1982 (#82000535) | 216 Huron St. 42°43′56″N 84°34′18″W | Lansing | |
| 35 | J.H. Moores Memorial Natatorium | J.H. Moores Memorial Natatorium | January 14, 1985 (#85000096) | 420 Moores River Dr. 42°43′01″N 84°33′23″W | Lansing | |
| 36 | Mutual Building | Mutual Building | September 17, 1980 (#80001870) | 208 N. Capitol Ave. 42°44′07″N 84°33′13″W | Lansing | |
| 37 | Philip Nice House | Philip Nice House | June 6, 1985 (#85001240) | 321 Center St. 42°34′59″N 84°26′52″W | Mason | |
| 38 | North Lansing Historic Commercial District | North Lansing Historic Commercial District | April 30, 1976 (#76001029) | 611 East-127 West Cesar E. Chavez Ave., 1207-1250 Turner Rd., 901-1135 North Washington St., and adjacent streets 42°44′52″N 84°33′00″W | Lansing | The portion of the district designated in 1976 included buildings within a one-block radius of the intersection of Turner Street and Cesar E. Chavez Avenue (then Grand River Avenue). A boundary increase was approved in 2021 expanding the district to the listed boundaries. |
| 39 | Ottawa Street Power Station | Ottawa Street Power Station | November 26, 2008 (#08001103) | 217 E. Ottawa St. 42°44′05″N 84°33′02″W | Lansing | |
| 40 | Penfil Apartments | Penfil Apartments | October 17, 1990 (#90001654) | 108-110 S. Hosmer St. 42°43′59″N 84°32′29″W | Lansing | |
| 41 | Prudden Wheel Company Building | Prudden Wheel Company Building | May 30, 2007 (#07000478) | 707 Prudden St. 42°44′27″N 84°32′33″W | Lansing | |
| 42 | Pulver Brothers Filling Station | Pulver Brothers Filling Station | August 4, 2016 (#16000507) | 127 W. Grand River Ave. 42°44′50″N 84°33′12″W | Lansing | |
| 43 | John Rayner House | John Rayner House | June 6, 1985 (#85001241) | 725 E. Ash St. 42°34′42″N 84°25′53″W | Mason | |
| 44 | Smith-Turner House | Smith-Turner House | July 11, 1980 (#80004604) | 326 W. Grand River Ave. 42°44′51″N 84°33′24″W | Lansing | |
| 45 | Somerville Barn | Somerville Barn | March 17, 2005 (#05000152) | 1050 N. College Rd. 42°36′45″N 84°28′59″W | Alaiedon Township | |
| 46 | St. Katherine's Chapel | St. Katherine's Chapel | July 8, 1970 (#70000272) | 4650 Meridian Rd., 42°43′07″N 84°21′43″W | Williamstown Township | |
| 47 | St. Mary Cathedral | St. Mary Cathedral | November 2, 1990 (#90001716) | 229 Seymour St. 42°44′08″N 84°33′22″W | Lansing | |
| 48 | State Office Building | State Office Building | May 17, 1984 (#84001432) | 320 S. Walnut St. 42°43′50″N 84°33′28″W | Lansing | |
| 49 | Stockbridge Town Hall | Stockbridge Town Hall | March 10, 1980 (#80001872) | 101 S. Clinton St. 42°27′02″N 84°10′46″W | Stockbridge | |
| 50 | Strand Theatre and Arcade | Strand Theatre and Arcade | September 17, 1980 (#80001871) | 211-219 S. Washington Ave. 42°43′55″N 84°33′05″W | Lansing | |
| 51 | Union Depot | Union Depot | July 21, 1995 (#95000869) | 637 E. Michigan Ave. 42°44′04″N 84°32′36″W | Lansing | |
| 52 | Washington Apartments | Washington Apartments | April 17, 2024 (#100010207) | 927 S. Washington Ave. 42°43′24″N 84°33′07″W | Lansing | |
| 53 | Westside Neighborhood Historic District | Westside Neighborhood Historic District | June 6, 1985 (#85001242) | Roughly bounded by W. Maple, W. Ash, Lansing and McRoberts Sts. 42°34′47″N 84°26′56″W | Mason | |
| 54 | Williamston Downtown Historic District | Williamston Downtown Historic District | December 12, 2012 (#12001029) | 1st blocks of E. & W. Grand River Ave. & S. Putnam St. 42°41′21″N 84°17′00″W | Williamston | |

== Former listings ==
| | Name on the Register | Image | Date listed | Date removed | Location | City or town | Description |
|---|---|---|---|---|---|---|---|
| 1 | Benjamin Davis House | Benjamin Davis House | February 7, 1972 (#72001589) | September 11, 1972 | 528 S. Washington Ave. 42°43′40″N 84°33′00″W | Lansing | Demolished in 1972. |
| 2 | Richard and Deborah (Brough) Glaister House | Richard and Deborah (Brough) Glaister House | March 21, 2017 (#100000763) | April 27, 2026 | 402 S. Walnut St. 42°43′47″N 84°33′26″W | Lansing | The house was demolished in 2025. |
| 3 | Reo Motor Car Company Plant | Reo Motor Car Company Plant | June 2, 1978 (#78001500) | March 5, 1986 | 2100 S. Washington St. 42°42′35″N 84°33′20″W | Lansing | Demolished by January 14, 1980. Formerly a National Historic Landmark. |

== See also ==
- List of Michigan State Historic Sites in Ingham County, Michigan
- List of National Historic Landmarks in Michigan
- National Register of Historic Places listings in Michigan
- Listings in neighboring counties: Clinton, Eaton, Jackson, Livingston, Shiawassee, Washtenaw
