= Stockbridge Township, Michigan =

- Civil township
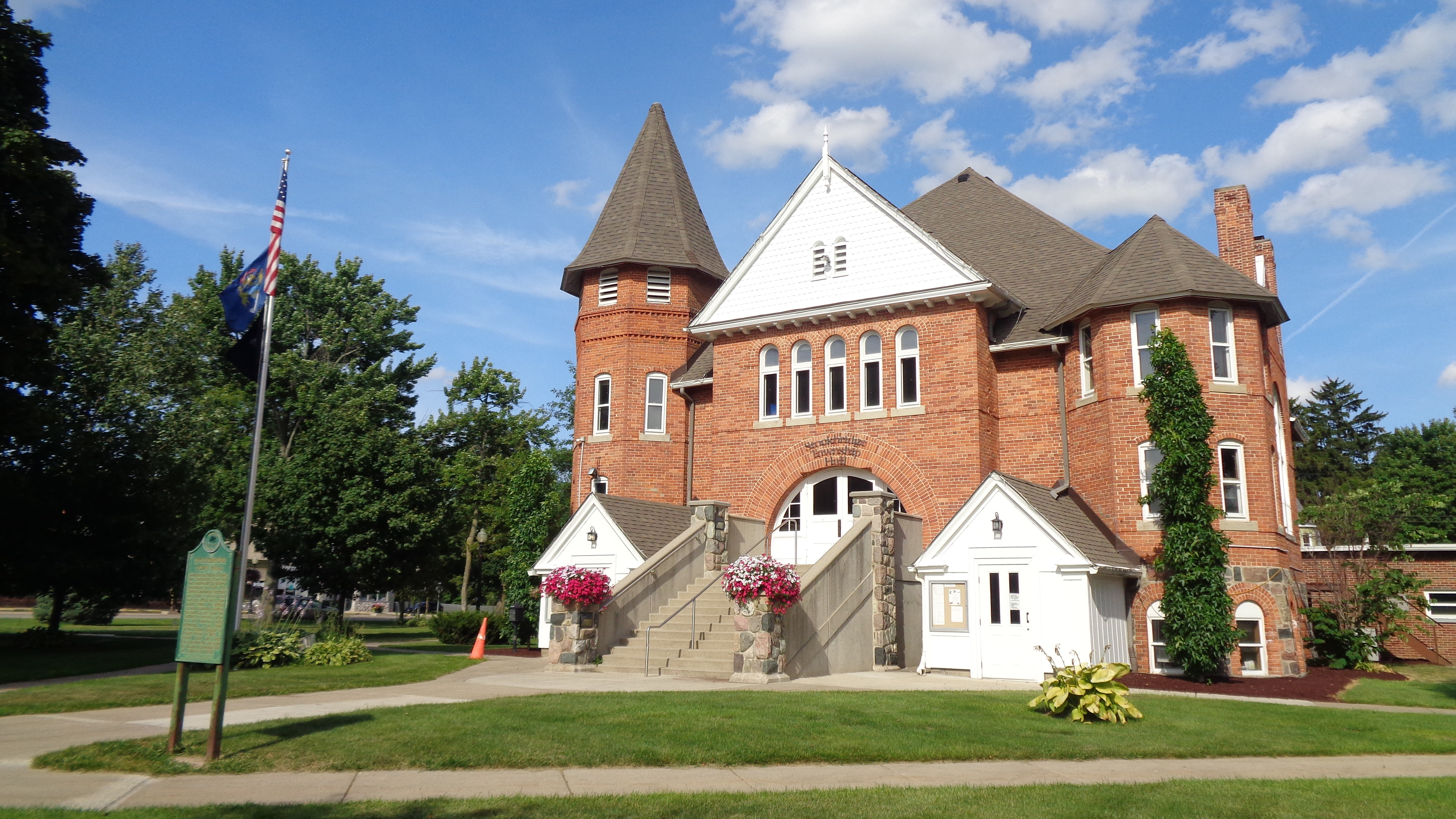
- Stockbridge Town Hall in Stockbridge

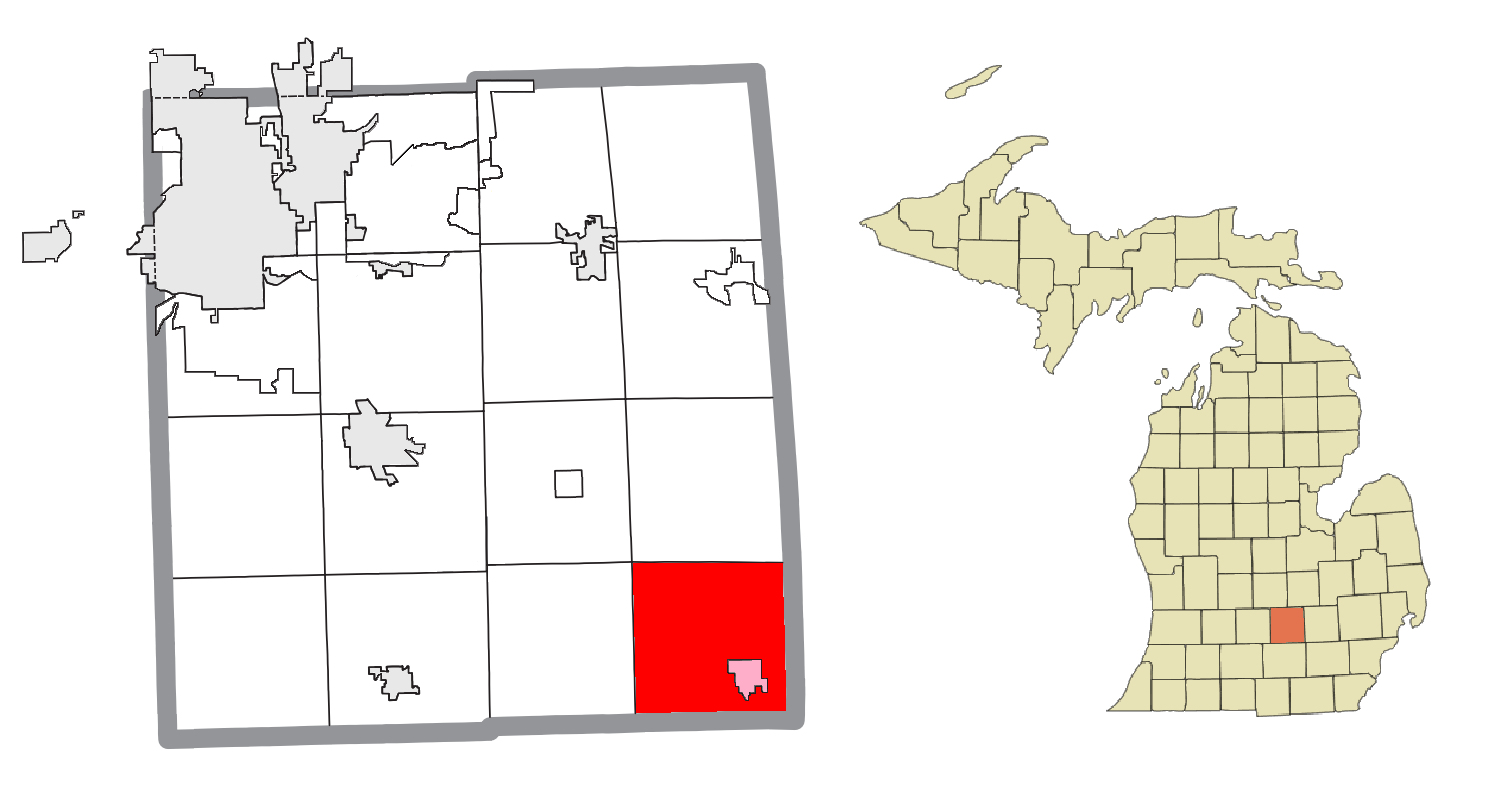
- Location within Ingham County (red) and the administered village of Stockbridge (pink)

- Location within the state of Michigan Location within the United States
- Coordinates: 42°27′32″N 84°11′37″W
- Country: United States
- State: Michigan
- County: Ingham
- Settled: 1834
- Established: 1836

Government
  - Supervisor: C.G. Lantis
  - Clerk: Becky Muraf

Area
  - Total: 35.92 sq mi (93.03 km^{2})
  - Land: 35.46 sq mi (91.84 km^{2})
  - Water: 0.46 sq mi (1.19 km^{2})
- Elevation: 938 ft (286 m)

Population (2020)
  - Total: 3,912
  - Density: 110.3/sq mi (42.6/km^{2})
- Time zone: UTC-5 (Eastern (EST))
  - Summer (DST): UTC-4 (EDT)
- ZIP code(s): 48819 (Dansville); 49285 (Stockbridge)
- Area code: 517
- FIPS code: 26-76580
- GNIS feature ID: 1627127
- Website: Official website

Stockbridge Township is a civil township of Ingham County in the U.S. state of Michigan. The population was 3,912 at the 2020 census.

== Communities ==
- Stockbridge is a village located in the southeast corner of the township. The Stockbridge 49285 ZIP Code serves the majority of the township.

== History ==
David Rogers was the first resident to settle in the area in 1834. When more travelers arrived, Stockbridge Township was established on November 26, 1836 as the first township in Ingham County. The village of Stockbridge, which was settled soon after, served as the main population center. The current township hall was constructed in Stockbridge in 1892. The building was listed on the National Register of Historic Places in 1980 and also as a Michigan State Historic Site in 1987.

== Geography ==
According to the United States Census Bureau, the township has a total area of 35.92 square miles (93.03 km^{2}), of which 35.46 square miles (91.84 km^{2}) is land and 0.46 square miles (1.19 km^{2}) (1.28%) is water.

Lakelands Trail State Park runs through part of the township and has its westernmost trailhead within the village of Stockbridge.

== Demographics ==
As of the census of 2000, there were 3,435 people, 1,220 households, and 941 families residing in the township. The population density was 96.4 inhabitants per square mile (37.2/km^{2}). There were 1,281 housing units at an average density of 35.9 per square mile (13.9/km^{2}). The racial makeup of the township was 97.41% White, 0.32% African American, 0.49% Native American, 0.15% Asian, 0.44% from other races, and 1.19% from two or more races. Hispanic or Latino of any race were 1.57% of the population.

There were 1,220 households, out of which 37.6% had children under the age of 18 living with them, 64.8% were married couples living together, 8.2% had a female householder with no husband present, and 22.8% were non-families. 19.7% of all households were made up of individuals, and 8.0% had someone living alone who was 65 years of age or older. The average household size was 2.76 and the average family size was 3.16.

In the township the population was spread out, with 27.6% under the age of 18, 6.9% from 18 to 24, 30.7% from 25 to 44, 23.7% from 45 to 64, and 11.1% who were 65 years of age or older. The median age was 36 years. For every 100 females, there were 95.9 males. For every 100 females age 18 and over, there were 95.4 males.

The median income for a household in the township was $44,295, and the median income for a family was $53,438. Males had a median income of $41,756 versus $27,500 for females. The per capita income for the township was $22,014. About 6.5% of families and 9.4% of the population were below the poverty line, including 12.2% of those under age 18 and 8.8% of those age 65 or over.

== Highways ==
- M-36 runs through the northeast corner of the township and forms a small portion of the northern boundary.
- M-52 runs north–south through the township and the center of the village of Stockbridge.
- M-106 runs through the southeast portion of the township and also runs concurrently with M-52 through Stockbridge.
