= Aubrey Radcliffe =

American university trustee

Aubrey Radcliffe (died March 27, 2009) was a Black American educator and political activist who served on the Board of Trustees at Michigan State University from 1973 until 1981. He was involved with the Republican Party and active in local human rights organising as a member of the NAACP and the American Legion.

== Biography ==
Radcliffe grew up in New York and Ohio. He graduated from Ohio State University and Youngstown University with bachelor's degrees, and obtained a master's degree from Michigan State University (MSU). He later returned to MSU for a doctorate in educational administration, receiving it prior to August 1972. He served in the U.S. Army from 1963 to 1965 as part of the Vietnam War, later becoming a member of the American Legion through East Lansing Post 205. In 1978, he was appointed to the Board of Trustees for the Michigan Veterans' Trust Fund as a representative of the Legion and later became chairman of the board. During the summer months he served as the sergeant-at-arms for the Michigan's American Legion Boys State program.

During the 1960s, Radcliffe worked as a counselor at West Junior High School in Lansing, Michigan. Before September 1969, he began working at Walter H. French Junior High School in Lansing. In the 1980s, Radcliffe was a counselor at J. W. Sexton High School.

=== Early political activities ===
Radcliffe had been associated with the Republican Party since at least 1965, when he was appointed the director of Michigan's first Republican camp for teenagers. During the late 1960s, he served as the state director of Republican Youth Activities. In 1966, Radcliffe was elected to be the national committeeman for the Michigan Young Republicans, being the first black person to serve in the role.

In September 1969, Radcliffe was named as a vice chairman of the Michigan Republican Party's Taskforce on Human Rights. He had previously served as a member of William Milliken's civil rights taskforce during his period as governor and special assistant to Michigan party chair Elly M. Peterson. During the late 1960s, Radcliffe was a member of the NAACP and the Greater Lansing Urban League.

=== Trustee at Michigan State University ===
In August 1972, Radcliffe was endorsed by the Ingham County Republicans for a position on the MSU Board of Trustees. The Alumni Association's Republican Selections Committee had suggested two other candidates for the open positions, arguing that Radcliffe was "among the most qualified" but not the most qualified. He was endorsed by the Detroit Free Press independent newspaper, who praised his "long record of service to his community and to education", and the Lansing State Journal, who suggested his appointment would bring balance to the board. He was the sole Republican endorsed by the Lansing branch of the NAACP in a series of elections which included the United States Senate election and the presidential election.

Radcliffe was elected to the MSU Board of Trustees in November 1972, followed in second place by fellow Republican Jack Stack. The election of both candidates meant there would be an equal number of Republicans and Democrats on the board. By winning the election, Radcliffe became the first Black person to be elected to statewide office for the Republican Party.

While a trustee at MSU, Radcliffe served on a subcommittee focused on student publications. He spoke out against the reduced number of Black students attending the university during the 1970s, arguing that it was a deliberate measure enacted to "control black males in this society". He also supported affirmative action in the university's hiring processes: he blocked the 1979 appointment of Robert F. Banks as an assistant provost due to the lack of black or minority staff members on his team when serving as dean of MSU's James Madison College, as well as recent revelations that there were very few women or minorities in MSU's upper executive ranks.

=== Later political activities ===
In January 1980, Radcliffe announced his candidacy to be the Republican nomination for Michigan's 6th congressional district in that year's elections. That August, he lost the Republican primary to James Whitney Dunn after spending just $1,500 on his election campaign. In the same month, he was passed over in a renomination bid for his position on the MSU Board of Trustees. He accused the state's Republican leadership of racism and suggested that they should have nominated a Black candidate in his place if they had opposed him for reasons external to his race.

=== Personal life ===
Radcliffe lived in East Lansing, Michigan. He had two children: a son (Richard) and a daughter (Deborah).

Radcliffe died in East Lansing at 75 years old on March 27, 2009.
