= Lansing Downtown Historic District =

- U.S. National Register of Historic Places
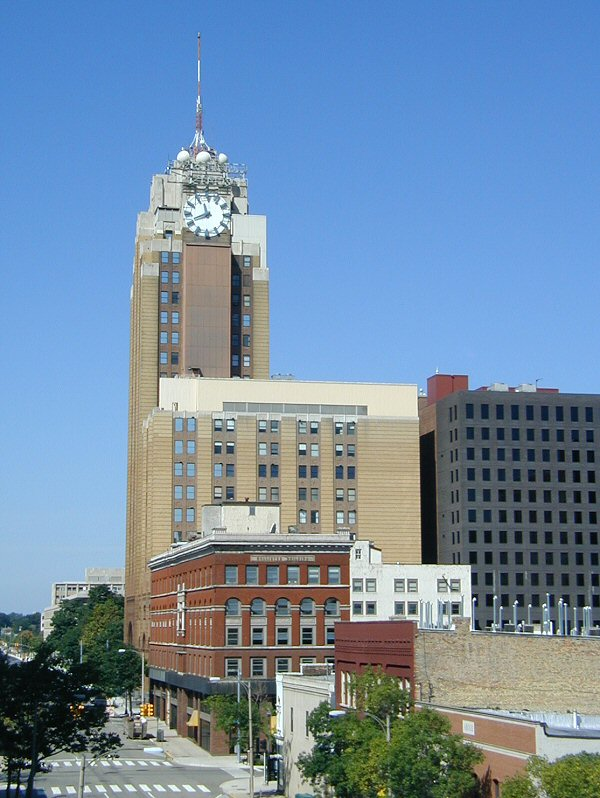
- Interactive map
- Location: N. and S. Washington, Grand, N. and S. Capitol, Michigan Ave., Allegan, Washtenaw, Kalamazoo, Lenawee, and Townsend, Lansing, Michigan
- Coordinates: 42°43′53″N 84°33′11″W
- Area: 40 acres (16 ha)
- Architect: Kenneth C. Black, et al.
- Architectural style: Late Victorian, Classical Revival
- MPS: Downtown Lansing MRA
- NRHP reference No.: 09000551
- Added to NRHP: July 22, 2009

The Lansing Downtown Historic District is a primarily commercial and office historic district located in downtown Lansing, Michigan. The district stretches along the east side of Capitol Avenue from Ionia Street to Lenawee Street, and along both sides of Grand Avenue between Michigan and Washtenaw, with additional structures along Kalamazoo Street between Walnut and Grand and along Lenawee Street between Washington and Walnut. The district was listed on the National Register of Historic Places in 2009.

== History ==
Lansing was established in 1847, with a large plat reserved for the construction of the Michigan State Capitol. Government buildings were constructed near the intersection of Capitol Avenue and Kalamazoo Street, and the population of the settlement skyrocketed, reaching 3000 by 1859. By this time, there was substantial commercial development along Washington, and by the late 1860s, Washington Avenue from Ionia Street south to Kalamazoo Street was almost completely developed, primarily with one-and two-story commercial structures, along with some residences. Over the next few decades, the business district grew, and some of the early wooden buildings were replaced with more substantial brick structures. Capitol Avenue, only one block from Washington, remained a mix of residential and social/religious buildings. In the 1890s and early 1900s, larger five- and six-story buildings were constructed in the downtown.

During the 1910s and 1920s, the downtown was substantially transformed. Many older buildings were replaced with newer ones, and a number of bank and office buildings were built in the area, in addition to commercial spaces. This building boom pushed into Capitol Avenue, with previously residential areas transformed into commercial and office space. As the Great Depression arrived, building projects slowed, although several buildings were renovated or rebuilt during the late 1930s.

After World War II, the business district began expanding to the south down Washington, and the east along Michigan. Many buildings in the district were modernized. However, by the late 1960s and early 1970s, the rise of malls around the city edges led to a decline in the downtown shopping district, a trend that continued into the 2000s. Stores in the district closed, and offices replaced them. Urban renewal experiments resulted in the demolition of some of the historic buildings, and by the 1980s and 1990s, other buildings were demolished for no more than parking spaces.

By the mid-2000s, the downtown was entering a rejuvenation, started with the rehabilitation of The Arbaugh into a mixed-use development. Other buildings followed, and in the decade since the downtown has enjoyed a rebirth.

== Description ==
The Lansing Downtown Historic District encompasses the central core of Lansing's business district, primarily along Washington and Capitol Avenues, and buildings clustered around Reutter Park. The district contains 88 buildings, of which 75 contribute to the historic character of the district. The buildings are predominantly from the 1880s to the 1930s, although some structures were built as early as the 1860s. Buildings along Washington are mostly small-scale commercial structures of two of three stories and a single storefront wide. Capitol Avenue is different in character, containing large-scale office, hotel, and public and institutional buildings up to 16 stories high. More government and institutional buildings, as well as large apartment buildings, are located around Reutter Park. Architectural styles represented include Italianate, Commercial Brick, Neoclassical, Georgian Revival, Renaissance Revival, Art Deco, Art Moderne, International Style, and others.

The district contains several individually notable building, including:

- Boji Tower, a 22-story building (the tallest in Lansing), built in 1929–31 as the Capital Bank Tower.
- Christman Building, builtin 1927–28 as the Mutual Building.
- Masonic Temple Building, built in 1923–27.
- George W. Romney Building, built in 1925–26 as the Olds Hotel.
- Lansing Woman's Club Building, built in 1890.
- Michigan Millers Mutual Fire Insurance Company Building, built in 1890.
- Comerica Bank Building, built in 1931–32 as the Bank of Lansing Building.
- The Arbaugh, built in 1905 for the Cameron & Arbaugh (later Arbaugh) department store.
- J.W. Knapp Company Building, built in 1937–38.
