= Washington Apartments (Lansing, Michigan) =

Historic building in Michigan, United States

- U.S. National Register of Historic Places
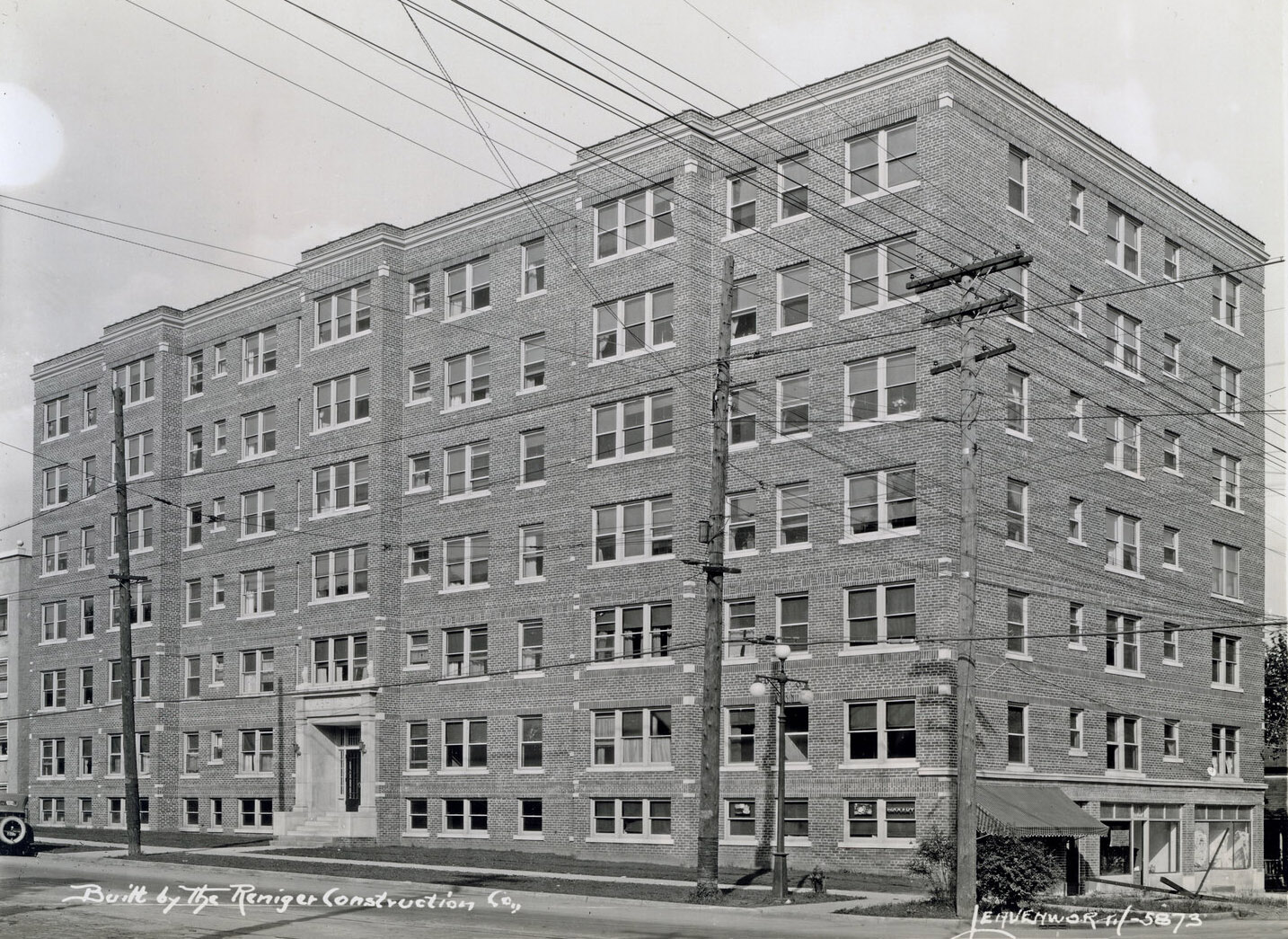
- Washington Apartments in 1922 shortly after construction
- Interactive map
- Location: 927 S. Washington Ave., Lansing, Michigan
- Coordinates: 42°43′24″N 84°33′7″W
- Built: 1922; 104 years ago
- Built by: Reniger Construction Company
- Architect: Judson N. Churchill
- Architectural style: Colonial Revival
- NRHP reference No.: 100010207
- Added to NRHP: April 17, 2024

Washington Apartments is an apartment building located at 927 South Washington Avenue in Lansing, Michigan. It was listed on the National Register of Historic Places in 2024.

== History ==
The Washington Apartments were constructed in 1922 to house factory workers from the nearby Reo Motor Car Company Plant. It was one of the largest residential apartment buildings constructed in Lansing during this period in the early 20th century. The building was funded by developer Lewis F. Breitenwischer, who had previously constructed apartment buildings in the area. Breitenwischer commissioned local architect Judson N. Churchill to design the building and hired Reniger Construction Company to build it. Construction began in ate 1922 and the apartment building was completed in 1923.

With the onset of the Great Depression, Breitenwischer defaulted on his mortgage bonds, and in 1932 the building was transferred to new management. In 1944 the building was sold to the Lansing Washington Apartments, Inc. However, the building was plagued with issues in the 21st century. The city of Lansing issued citations in 2012 and 2015. The city of Lansing ordered the building be vacated in September 2019 because the owners did not have a valid rental certificate. It remained vacant through 2024.

== Description ==
The Washington Apartments are a six-story Colonial Revival rectangular brick building with a flat asphalt roof. The front facade of the building contains three projecting bays; the main entrance is located in the central bay. An ornate painted wooden entryway surrounds the entrance doors. Each floor of the building contains double hung windows of varying sizes throughout. The building retains its original appearance with only minor modifications.
