= J.H. Moores Memorial Natatorium =

- U.S. National Register of Historic Places
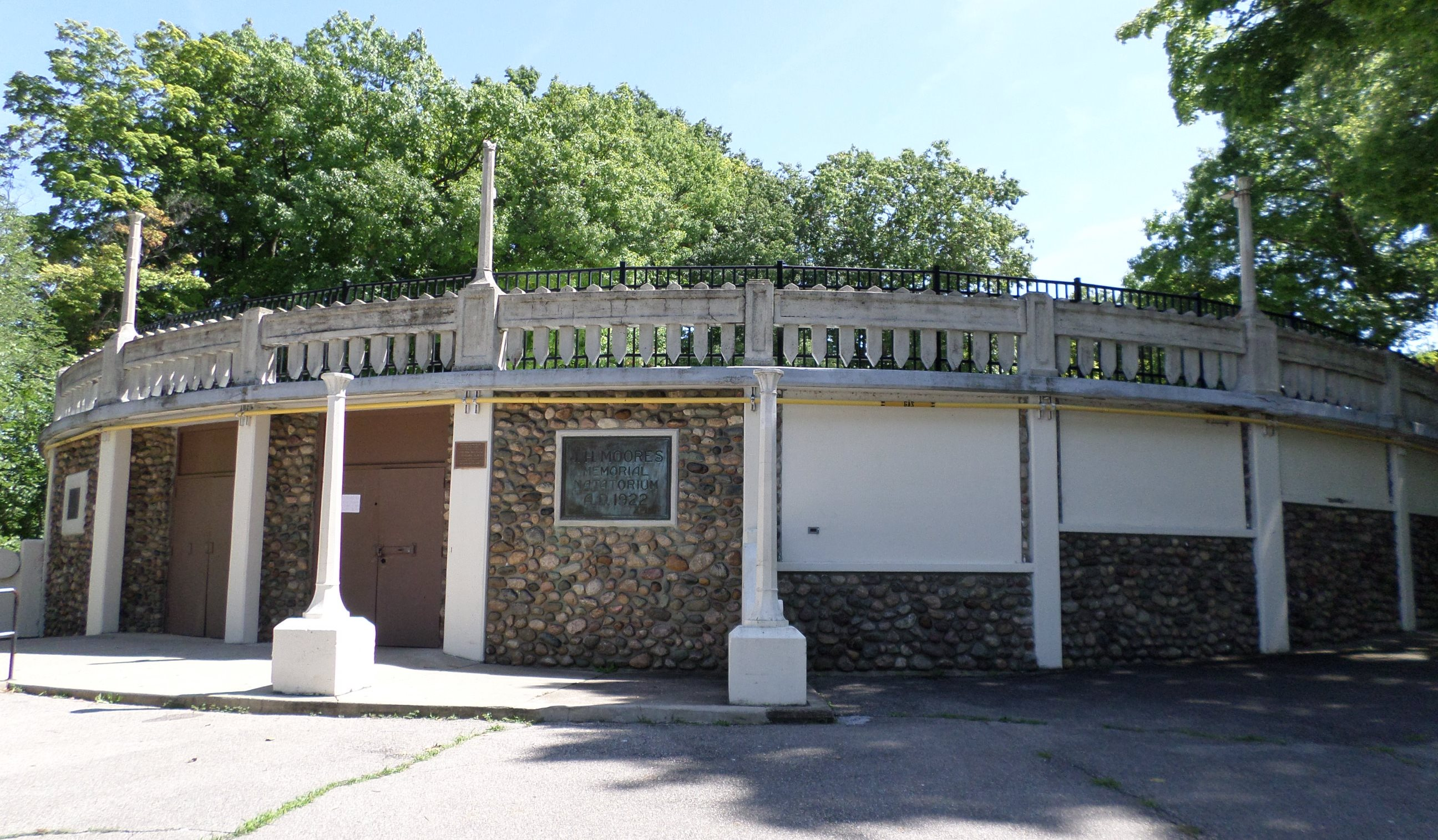
- Interactive map
- Location: 2700 Moores River Dr., Lansing, Michigan
- Coordinates: 42°43′01″N 84°33′23″W
- Area: 1.8 acres (0.73 ha)
- Built: 1923
- Architect: Wesley Bintz
- NRHP reference No.: 85000096
- Added to NRHP: January 14, 1985

The J.H. Moores Memorial Natatorium, also known as the Moores Park Pool, is a natatorium located at 2700 Moores River Drive in Lansing, Michigan. It was listed on the National Register of Historic Places in 1985. The pool at Moores Park was the prototype of what became known as the "Bintz Pool," an oval structure located entirely above ground, which was particularly suited to urban areas.

== History ==
J. Henry Moores arrived in Lansing in 1865, and through various business interests became one of the wealthiest men in the city. He spent much of his money establishing a public park system in Lansing. One of those parks was Moores Park, which he donated to the city in 1908. In the early 1920s, Wesley Bintz came to work in the city engineer's office, only a few years after receiving his degree from the University of Michigan in 1918. In 1922 he became the City Engineer, and in that capacity he designed this natatorium, which was constructed in 1923. Bintz resigned later that year, and began a career devoted to designing swimming pools.

The natatorium has been open every season, save when it was renovated in 1980. It may be the oldest continually operated municipal pool in the United States.

== Description ==
The Natatorium is an ellipsoidal, above-ground structure constructed of reinforced concrete with a rubble-stone facade. The entrance is on one end through two pairs of metal doors, flanked by plaques which read "Design supervised by W. Bintz, city engineer, swimming pool designs, 1922" on one side and "J.H. Moores Memorial Natatorium. A.D. 1922" on the other. Decorative parapets project on each side of the entrance. Original window openings have been filled in. A balustrade of reinforced concrete runs along the top, with lamp posts at regular intervals.

The interior contains two levels: an upper level formed by the deck surrounding the pool, and a lower level consisting of the interior space beneath the pool deck. The deck is 15 feet wide and runs around the pool. Bleachers, built into the natural hillside, are at one end. The interior also contains men's and women's dressing areas, an office, a storage room, and staff rooms.
