= Merrylees-Post House =

- U.S. National Register of Historic Places
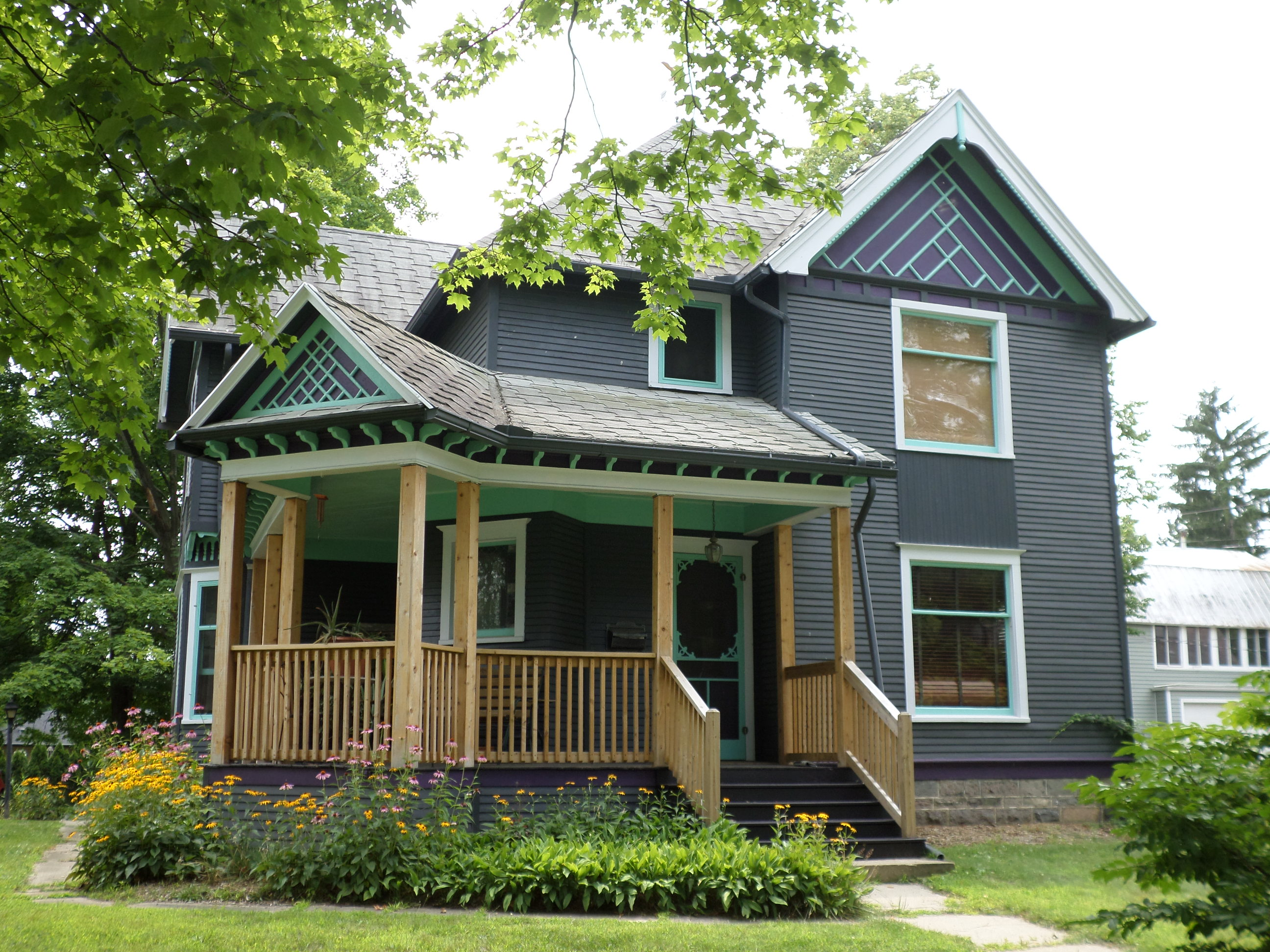
- Interactive map
- Location: 519 W. Ash St., Mason, Michigan
- Coordinates: 42°34′44″N 84°27′04″W
- Area: less than one acre
- Built: 1902
- Architectural style: Queen Anne
- MPS: Mason Michigan Historic MRA
- NRHP reference No.: 85001238
- Added to NRHP: June 6, 1985

The Merrylees-Post House is a single-family home located at 519 West Ash Street in Mason, Michigan. It was listed on the National Register of Historic Places in 1985.

== History ==
In 1901, Charles and Fannie Merrylees purchased the property this house stands on. Very little is known about the Merrylees. In 1902, they had this house constructed. In 1906, they sold the house to Sarah N. Post. Sarah and her husband William were in their sixties, and had been farmers in the area; they were likely using the house as a retirement home. They passed the house to their descendants; the family lived in the house until at least the 1980s.

== Description ==
The Merrylees-Post House is a two-story, hip-and-gable-roof house. It is one of the most notable Queen Anne style houses in Mason, with decorative features including scalloped-edge bargeboards, applied latticework in the main and porch gables; paneled friezes, and bracketry under the eaves of the porch. It has a front porch wrapping part of the way around two sides of the house.
