= Pulver Brothers Filling Station =

- U.S. National Register of Historic Places
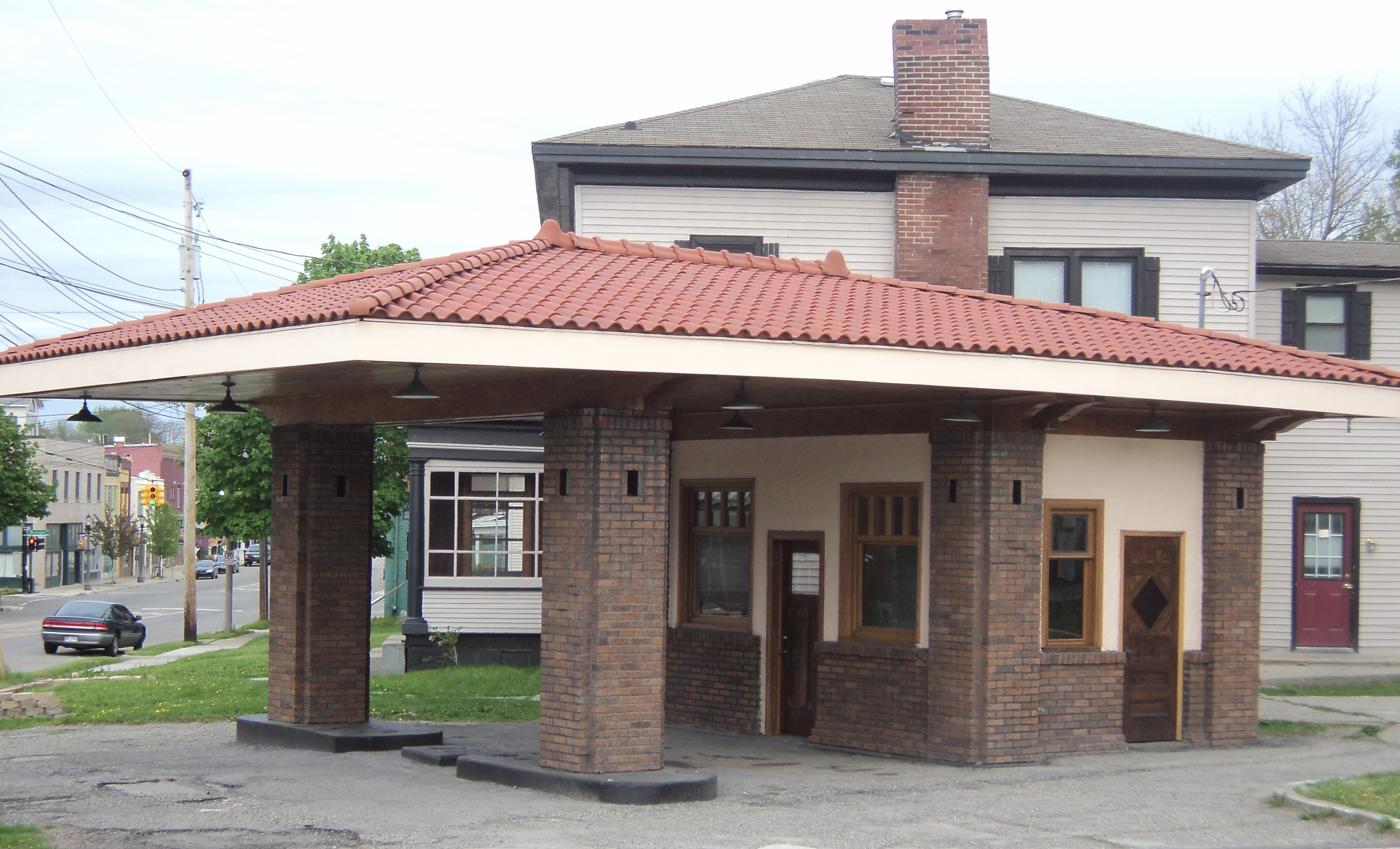
- Interactive map
- Location: 127 W. Grand River Ave., Lansing, Michigan
- Coordinates: 42°44′50″N 84°33′12″W
- Built: 1923
- Architectural style: Craftsman
- NRHP reference No.: 16000507
- Added to NRHP: August 4, 2016

The Pulver Brothers Filling Station is a former filling station located at 127 W. Grand River Avenue in Lansing, Michigan. It was listed on the National Register of Historic Places in 2016.

== History ==
Elmer Pulver was the owner of a hardware store. In the early 1920s, he and his brother Benjamin founded the Pulver Brothers Sinclair Oil company, affiliated with Sinclair Oil Corporation. By 1924, Pulver Brothers had constructed four filling stations around Lansing, including this one which was built in 1923. A fifth station, unlike this one in architectural style, was added in 1925, and by 1930 the company owned eight stations.

The Pulver Brothers owned and operated the Grand River Avenue filling station until 1938, after which other owners operated it as a filling station until 1953. After ceasing to be used as a filling station, it housed a dry cleaners until 1956, and then remained vacant until 2009. The building was rehabilitated, and opened in 2011 as a drive through coffee shop and cafe. The coffee shop closed in 2014, and the building reopened as Scoop's Ice Cream Parlor in the spring of 2016.

== Description ==
The Pulver Brothers Filling Station is a small one-story brown brick and stucco Craftsman building with a red hipped terra cotta tile roof. The design is representative of type of filling station commonly built in the 1920s, having a small "house" with an attached canopy. The "house" section measures 12 feet by 20 feet, and is constructed of brick at the bottom with stucco above. Brick runs up each corner to form a simple pier; An additional pair of free-standing piers, located 23 feet in front of the house section, support the end of the canopy. The original main entrance to the building is flanked by two large four-over-one windows. A second entrance is located on the opposite corner.
