= Somerville Barn =

- U.S. National Register of Historic Places
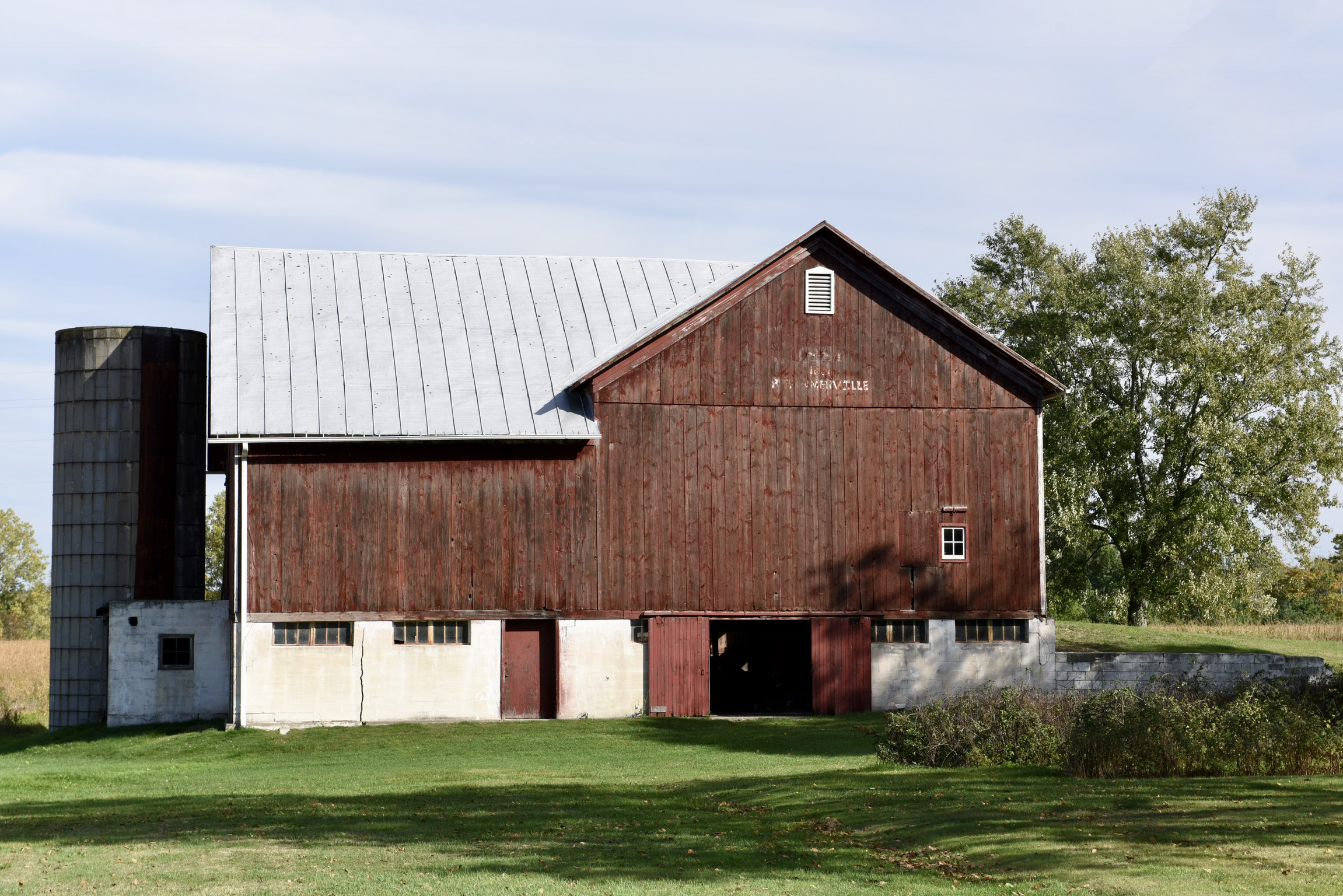
- Interactive map
- Location: 1050 N. College Rd., Alaiedon Township, Michigan
- Coordinates: 42°36′45″N 84°28′59″W
- Area: 1 acre (0.40 ha)
- Built: c. 1865
- Architectural style: Raised Barn
- NRHP reference No.: 05000152
- Added to NRHP: March 17, 2005

The Somerville Barn, also known as the Caltrider Barn, is part of a farmstead located at 1050 North College Road in Alaiedon Township, Michigan. It was listed on the National Register of Historic Places in Michigan in 2005.

== History ==
William and Jane Somerville emigrated from Lanarkshire, Scotland in 1849, following Jane's brother John, and settled in Delhi Township. In 1854, they established a farm across what is now College Road from this barn, eventually building a house located about a quarter-mile north of the location of this barn. In 1863, the Somervilles purchased the land that this barn stands on, across College Road from their farmstead. A few years later, Somerville built a barn across from his house on the newly acquired property.

In 1875, William Somerville conveyed his son James fifty acres of his property, including the present site of Somerville barn. James married Agnes Fellows in 1878, and the couple settled on their homestead. They built a (now much altered) house on the property. In 1881, James Somerville constructed a barn on his property. In 1887, he purchased additional acreage from his father, including the c. 1865 barn, and moved the barn to his farmstead, attaching it to the 1881 barn. Around 1900, he expanded the barn by adding an ell to one end.

James and Agnes Sommerville's son John married Ida Warren Palen in 1907; the couple had a son, Palen James Somerville, in 1912. However, John Somerville died in 1919; Ida remarried and lived with James Somerville until his death in 1930. Palen Somerville inherited the farm, but had moved to the family cottage, and rented the farmstead out. In 1932, he married Millie Scott, and in 1938 they returned to the Somreville farm. They added a concrete silo to the barn, and made other repairs and improvements to the farm and barn in the next decade. By 1959, Palen and Mille retired from farming and began renting out the farm acreage. Their daughter, JoAnn, and her husband, Robert Earl Caltrider operated a sheep breeding and shearing operation in the barn until 1972. Since that time, the barn has been used primarily for storage.

== Description ==
The Somerville Bam is an L-shaped wood-frame raised barn building. It is constructed from two English barns attached end-to-end, forming a structure ninety feet long. The two barns are made of hewn timber frames, with some logs still having bark on. The basement level is mostly concrete block, which is fully above ground level on three sides. The barn is part of a farmstead also contains a house.

The westerly section of the barn measures about forty-six feet in length by about thirty-four feet in width. The easterly section is about forty-four feet in length and thirty-two and one-half in width. The front facades are set to align. The barn also has a rear ell, measuring about forty-four feet in width and about twenty-seven feet in depth, and a small projecting silo room and round concrete stave silo.
