= Bailey Buildings =

- U.S. National Register of Historic Places
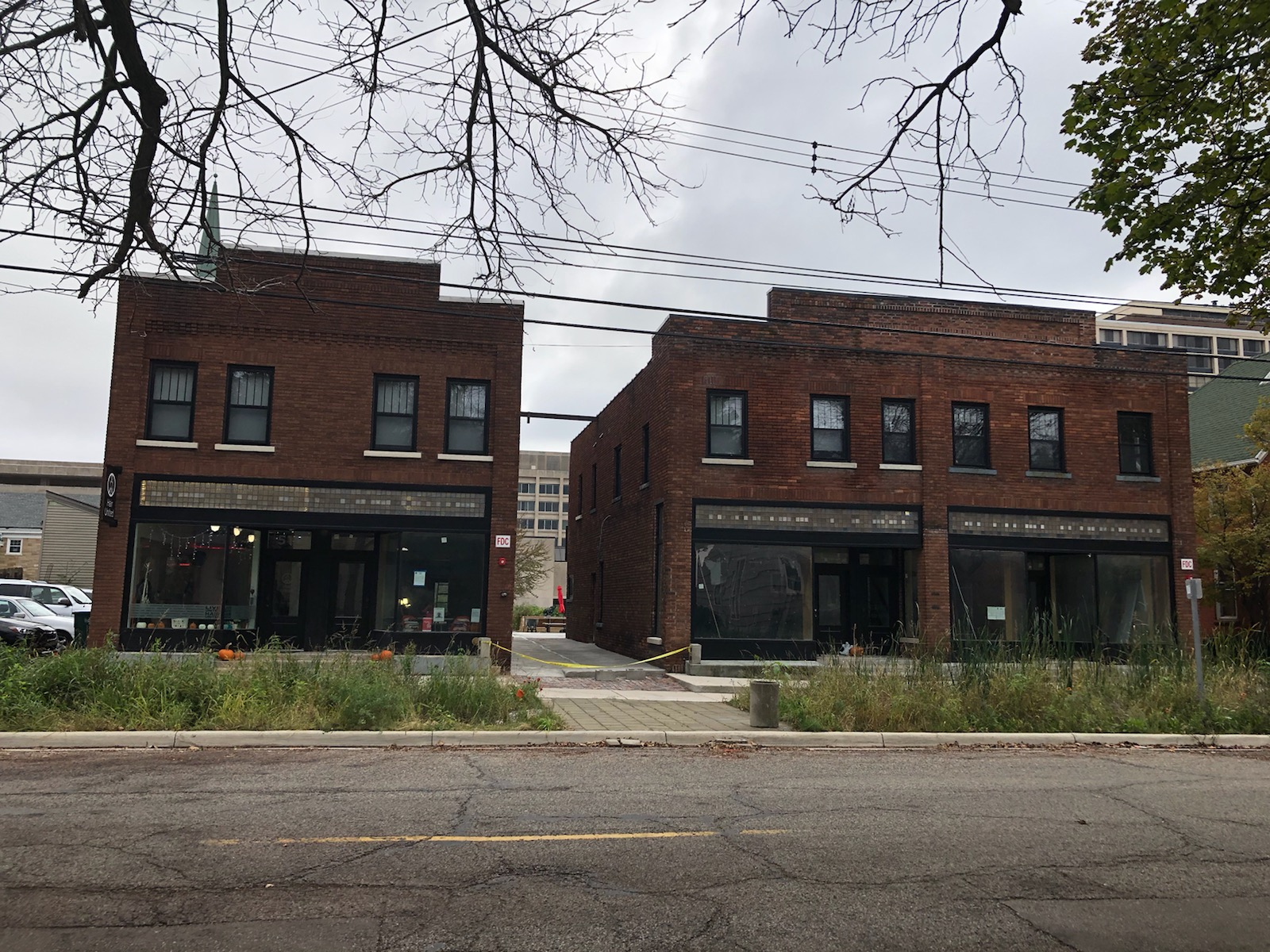
- View of the Bailey Building from across the street, as seen in October 2021.
- Interactive map
- Location: 513-519 West Ionia St., Lansing, Michigan
- Coordinates: 42°44′9″N 84°33′33″W
- Built: 1922; 104 years ago
- Built by: Cooper-Ehinger Construction Co.
- Architectural style: Commercial Brick
- NRHP reference No.: 100006364
- Added to NRHP: April 8, 2021; 5 years ago

The Bailey Buildings are two related commercial structures, located at 513-519 West Ionia Street in Lansing, Michigan. They were listed on the National Register of Historic Places in 2021.

== History ==
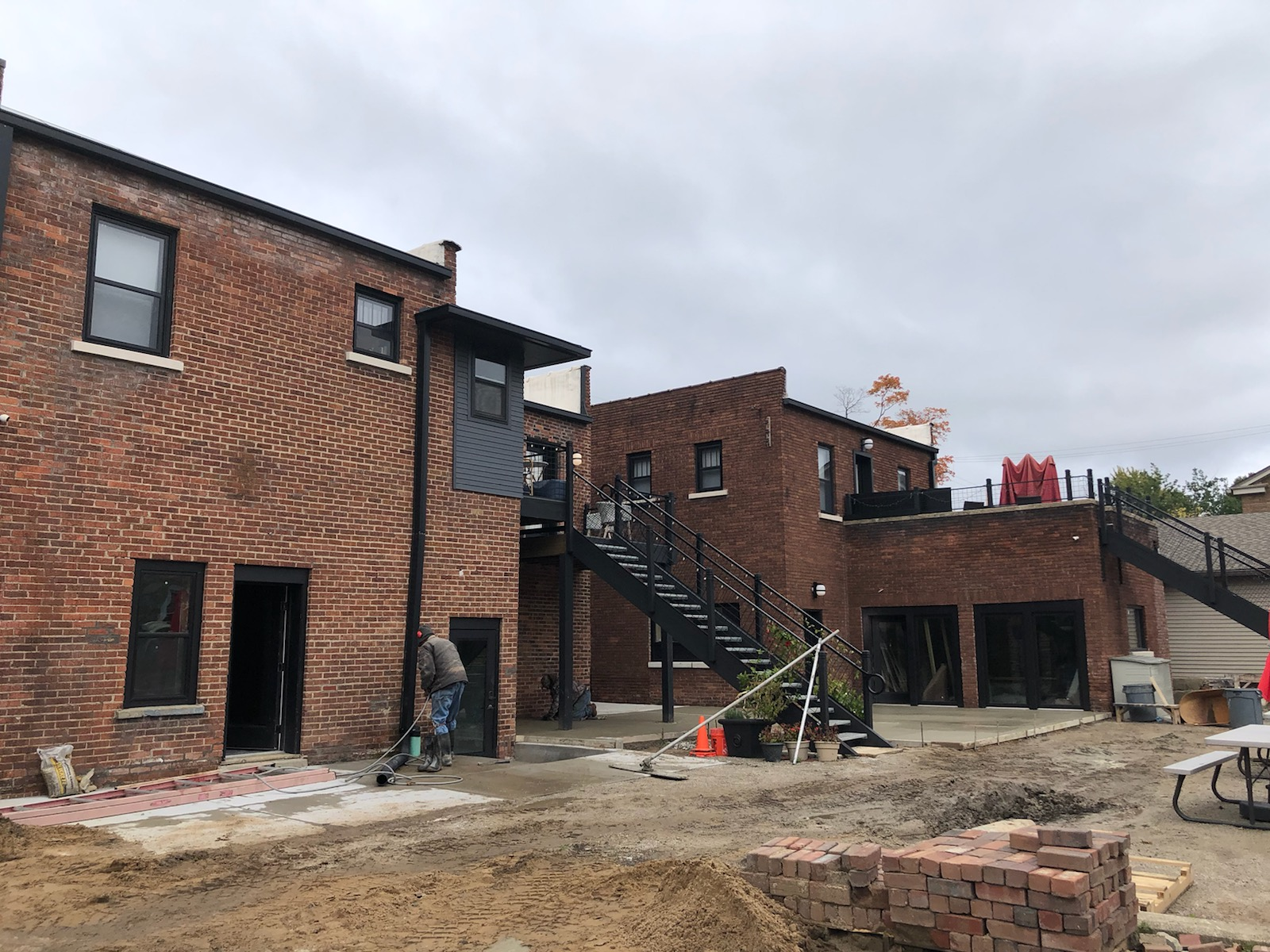
Backdoor entrances of the Bailey Buildings in October 2021.

Orla H. Bailey was born in Lansing in 1873. He spent some time as a clerk at the Cottage Grocery store, then in 1900 rented a wooden commercial building at this location on Ionia Street and opened his own grocery. IN 1915, Bailey purchased the property outright. The grocery business continued to prosper, and in 1922 Bailey hired local firm Cooper-Ehinger Construction Company to build a new store at the same location. Construction on the building (517-519 Ionia) began in July, and was finished by January 1923. Bailey moved his grocery into the buildings, and let out the other storefront to the Jay M. Toy Electrical Company. In 1925, Bailey purchased the nearby lot, and in 1927 constructed a second, similar building (513-515 Ionia). He leased space to barber Alvin B. Cooley and the Russel Bakery.

Bailey apparently later acquired the bakery, and operated both the grocery and the bakery until his death from a heart attack in 1943. The businesses passed to his son, Orla H. Bailey Jr., who ran the bakery through the late 1940s, and the grocery until 1959. The storefronts were occupied by a series of businesses afterward, notably Chauncey's Barber Shop which occupied a space from 1929 though 1984, and Belen's Flowers which occupied a space from 1969 to 2010. The two buildings were sold to real estate broker Spiro Tesseris and his wife Sophia in 1984, and was purchased by 515 Ionia LLC in 2015. They completely rehabilitated the buildings, and as of 2021 have leased to new tenants.

== Description ==
The Bailey Buildings are a pair of red brick commercial buildings, located in a neighborhood just outside of Lansing's central business district. Both buildings are flat roofed, two-story double storefront structures with commercial space on the ground floor and apartments above. The buildings have minimal ornamentation. The building at 513-515 West Ionia Street measures 27 feet across by 60 feet deep, with an 18 by 18 foot, single-story addition located at the southeast corner. On the façade, a recessed central entrance is flanked by large display windows. Each storefront has a separate entrance. The building at 517-519 West Ionia Street is larger than the first building, but very similar in style. It measures 47 feet across the front by 51 feet deep.
