= Richard and Deborah (Brough) Glaister House =

- Formerly listed on the U.S. National Register of Historic Places
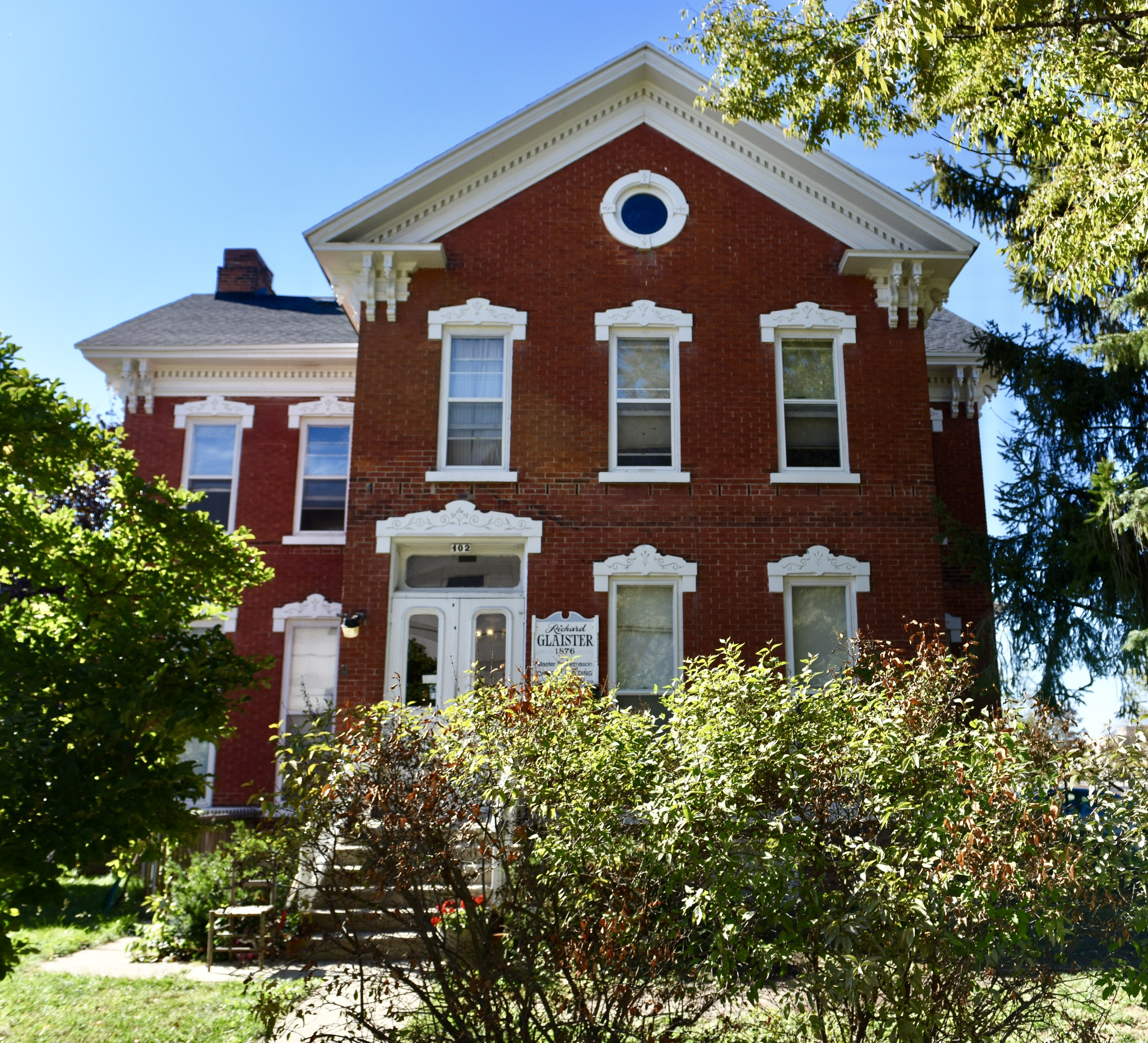
- Interactive map
- Location: 402 S. Walnut St., Lansing, Michigan
- Coordinates: 42°43′47″N 84°33′26″W
- Built: 1876
- Architect: Richard Appleyard
- Architectural style: Queen Anne, Italianate
- Demolished: July 2025
- NRHP reference No.: 100000763

Significant dates
- Added to NRHP: March 21, 2017
- Removed from NRHP: April 27, 2026

The Richard and Deborah (Brough) Glaister House was a single-family home located at 402 South Walnut Street in Lansing, Michigan. It was listed on the National Register of Historic Places in 2017, but removed from the National Register in 2026. after its 2025 demolition.

== History ==
Richard Glaister was born in 1826 in England, and married Deborah Brough in 1847. In 1864 the Glaister family moved to Ottawa, Canada, and in 1868 moved to Detroit. Glaister worked as a stonemason, and did the stone work on Pittsburgh's Trinity Cathedral. Returning from Pittsburgh, he was hired to do the stonework for the Michigan State Capitol in Lansing.

Richard and Deborah Glaister built this house in 1876, likely from a design by architect Richard Appleyard. They raised their family here, and lived in the house until Richard's death in 1887. Deborah Glaister continued to live in the house after her husband's death.

The house served as a boardinghouse for some time. Alice Sessions purchased the home in 1966, and worked to preserve it. In 2017, it was sold to a nearby business. In 2023, the City Rescue Mission of Lansing purchased it from the business in a non-cash transaction, and in July 2025 they demolished the nearly 150 year old building.

== Description ==
The Richard and Deborah Glaister House was a two-story, red brick house. It had both Queen Anne and Italianate details, including tall windows, carved stone window lintels, and highly detailed wood brackets under the eaves. It contained 14 rooms.
