= Philip Nice House =

- U.S. National Register of Historic Places
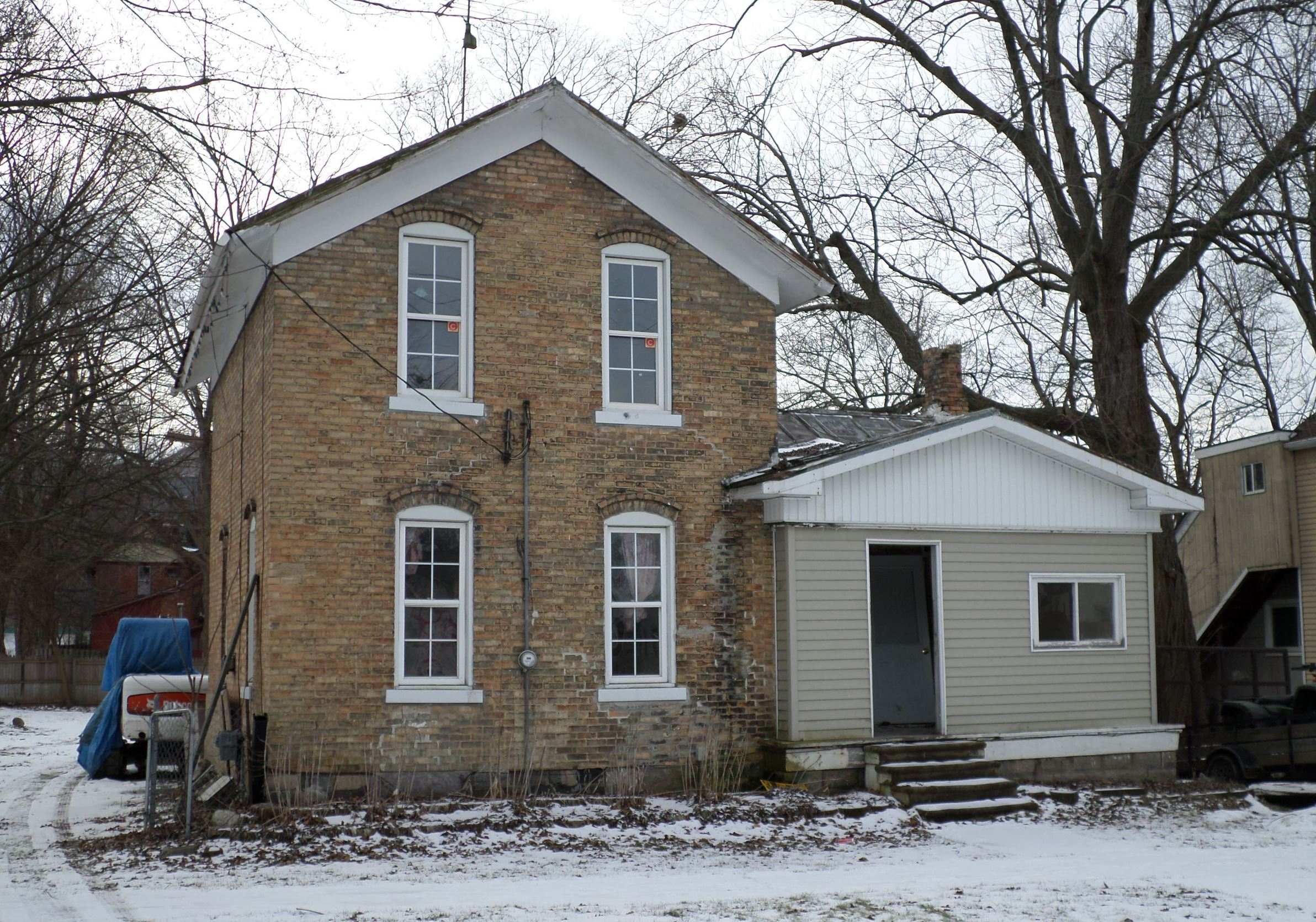
- Interactive map
- Location: 321 Center St., Mason, Michigan
- Coordinates: 42°34′59″N 84°26′52″W
- Area: less than one acre
- Built: 1867
- Architectural style: Upright and Wing
- MPS: Mason Michigan Historic MRA
- NRHP reference No.: 85001240
- Added to NRHP: June 6, 1985

The Philip Nice House is a single-family home at 321 Center Street in Mason, Michigan. It was listed on the National Register of Historic Places in 1985.

== History ==
Philip Nice was born in Lautersheim, Germany, in 1832, and emigrated to the United States at seventeen. He arrived in Mason in 1861 and worked as a farmer outside the city. He was also involved in lumbering and gravel extraction. In 1867, he purchased two lots and built this house for his family. The Nice family lived there until 1883, when the house was purchased by Elisha and Betsy Bennett, who owned a business block in downtown Mason.

== Description ==
The Philip Nice House is a brick structure designed in the Upright and Wing style, with a two-story upright and a single-story wing. It has gently sloping roofs with wide frieze boards. The windows are four-over-four units, topped with brick voussoir segmental arches and flanked with shutters. The side wing has an entryway through an early twentieth-century porch, with a pedimented roof supported by round, tapered columns.
