= Westside Neighborhood Historic District =

- U.S. National Register of Historic Places
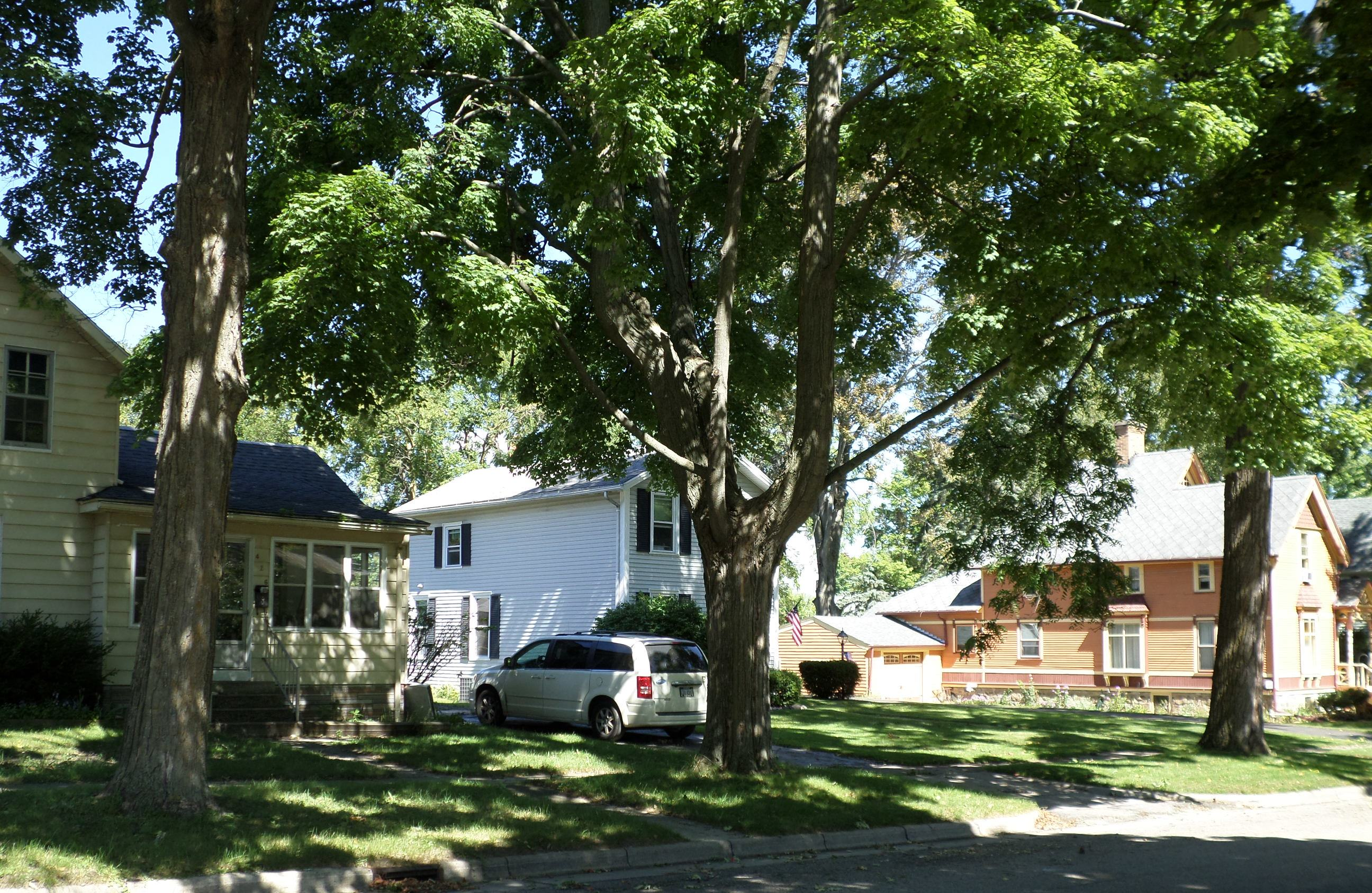

- Location within Michigan Location within the United States
- Interactive map
- Location: Roughly bounded by W. Maple, W. Ash, Lansing and McRoberts Sts., Mason, Michigan
- Coordinates: 42.579722°N 84.448889°W
- Area: 11 acres (4.5 ha)
- Architectural style: Colonial Revival, Queen Anne
- MPS: Mason Michigan Historic MRA
- NRHP reference No.: 85001242
- Added to NRHP: June 6, 1985

The Westside Neighborhood Historic District is a residential historic district, located along West Maple, and West Ash Street between South McRoberts Street and the railroad grade east of Sycamore Creek in Mason, Michigan. It also includes The district was listed on the National Register of Historic Places in 1985.

== History ==
The Westside Neighborhood Historic District is part of the Barnes and Price Addition, which was platted in 1866. Development began in the 1870s, with many of the hoses in the district being constructed in the late 1800s. Early residents were business and professional people, including two tinsmiths, an undertaker, a foundry owner, a carpenter, a physician, and a retired city attorney.

== Description ==
The Westside Neighborhood Historic District is a roughly rectangular area that includes one block of West Maple and one block of West Ash, as well as the city park along both sides of Sycamore Creek. The district includes 47 structures, primarily single-family homes of frame construction, built in the late 19th century. The houses are sited on large lots along tree-lines streets, and are set back from the road. The homes are primarily Colonial Revival and Queen Anne styles, but also include vernacular Greek Revival and Italianate structures.

The Mason City Park is a landscaped area that has been used since the early history of the city. The district also includes an 1888 stone arch railroad bridge constructed over Sycamore Creek, and a concrete arch bridge on Maple Street.

Significant structures include:

- Harlow A. Beech House (452 West Maple): This house is a two-story Queen Anne structure constructed in 1887 for Harlow A. Beech, the owner-operator of an iron foundry. It has a clipped-gable roof and clapboard and ship-lap siding with a projecting second story.
- Augustus A. Howard House (451 West Ash Street): This house is a two-story, vernacular structure constructed in 1878/9 for Augustus A. Howard, who owned a local grocery. Around the turn of the century, the house was purchased by Sidney and Anna Culver, who added a two-story rear wing.
- Joseph P. Smith House (414 West Maple): This house is a two-story multi -gabled Queen Anne constructed in 1889 for Joseph P. Smith, a tinsmith, and his wife Lillian. They lived in the house until 1922. It has substantial decoration and an elaborately decorated porch.
- James Fred and Lizzie Lewis House (427 West Maple): This house was constructed in 1890 for James and Lizzie Lewis. In 1891, it was purchased by John c. Fingerle, who was a partner in a hardware business. It is a modest two-story cross-gabled Queen Anne structure with fishscale shingling in the gable peaks.
- James A. Sherwood House (404 West Maple): This house was constructed in 1893 for contractor and lumber dealer James A. Sherwood. It is an L-shaped, two-story multi-gabled house with clapboard siding and fishscale shingles.
- George W. Bristol House (439 West Ash Street): This house was constructed in 1912 for George W. Bristol, a civic leader and son of a local pioneering family. It is a large, gable-to-side, two-and-one-half-story, Colonial Revival structure with a large central gable dormer.
