= Motor Wheel Lofts =

- Prudden Wheel Company Building
- U.S. National Register of Historic Places
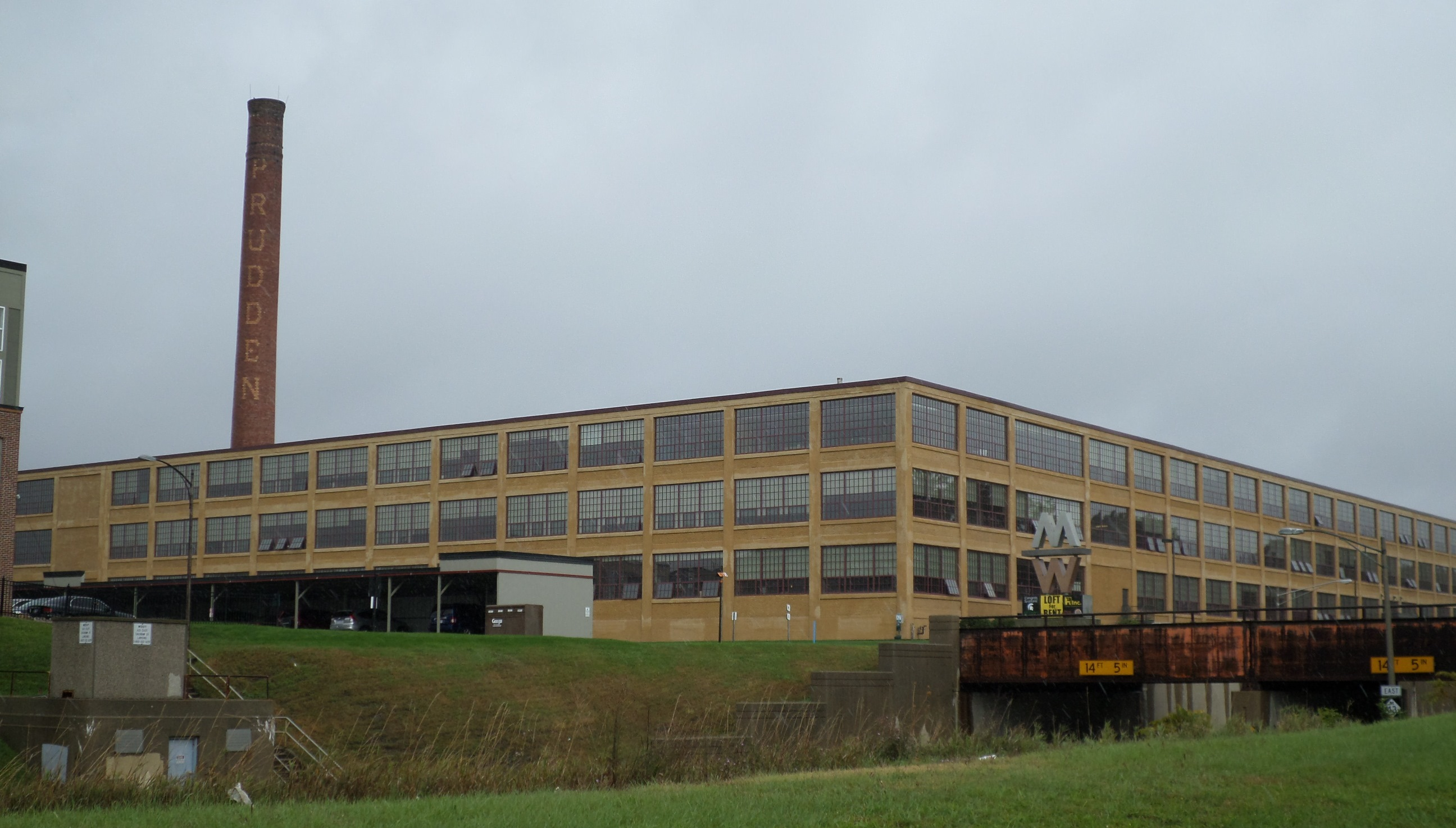
- Interactive map
- Location: 707 Prudden St., Lansing, Michigan
- Coordinates: 42°44′37″N 84°32′33″W
- Area: 2.3 acres (0.93 ha)
- Built: 1916
- Architectural style: Concrete industrial loft
- NRHP reference No.: 07000478
- Added to NRHP: May 30, 2007

Motor Wheel Lofts (formerly the Prudden Wheel Company Building or the Motor Wheel Corporation Building) is an apartment building converted from a former industrial building. It was listed it on the National Register of Historic Places in 2007.

== History ==
William K. Prudden was born in 1859, attended Michigan State Agricultural College, and lived for several years in Indianapolis and Chicago. He worked as a real estate broker, and was also part owner of the Lansing Wheel Company, which provided wheels for carriages and wagons. The company was a great success, and in 1903 Prudden launched his own enterprise, W. K. Prudden & Company, to manufacture wheels. The company became a major supplier to the fledgling automobile industry, particularly Olds Motor Works. The original factory was located on Michigan Avenue, but in 1905 Prudden acquired this site along East Saginaw Street. By 1913, the company had constructed at least 18 buildings on the site, using both sides of May Street. In 1916, Prudden built the current structure for use as office and assembly space.

The company continued to expand, and in 1916 reorganized as the Prudden Wheel Company. In 1920, Prudden merged with local companies Auto Wheel and Gier Pressed Steel, and the Memphis, Tennessee form of Weis & Lesh Manufacturing to form the Motor Wheel Corporation. The headquarters of the company remained at this plant. Motor Wheel moved into making steel wheels in the 1920s and brake drums in the 1930s.

In 1961, Motor Wheel moved its headquarters to another facility, and demolished many of the buildings on the old site. Motor Wheel became a subsidiary of Goodyear Tire and Rubber Company in 1964, but left Lansing entirely in 1996. Meanwhile, the former headquarters building remained vacant until it was purchased by an investor in 1996. The building was converted into the Motor Wheel Lofts by developer Harry H Hepler in 2007.

== Description ==
The Prudden Wheel building is a three-story L-shaped structure of reinforced concrete with brick curtain walls. The southern leg, containing the main facade, measures approximately 382 feet long and 79 feet wide. The rear leg measures approximately 311 feet long and 101 feet wide. The main facade on the south side is 18 bays wide, with each bay containing window openings 18 feet with and 9-1/2 feet tall, with concrete sills. A new entryway was constructed in 2006 during renovation. The rear leg is 15 bays wide, with similar window openings. On the far end is a distinctive smokestack, bearing the name "Prudden" vertically in contrasting brick.
