= Barnes Avenue School =

- U.S. National Register of Historic Places
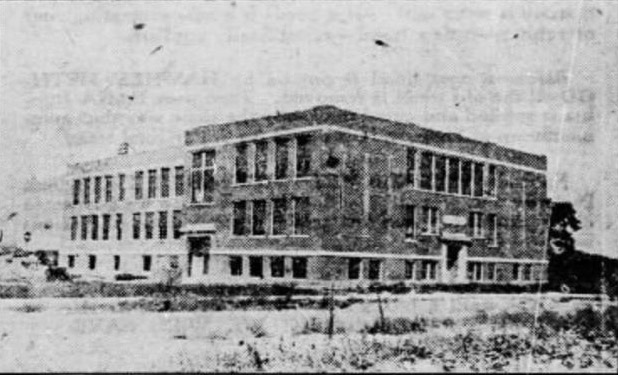
- Barnes Avenue School in 1920
- Interactive map
- Location: 1028 West Barnes Ave., Lansing, Michigan
- Coordinates: 42°42′55″N 84°34′0″W
- Built: 1919; 107 years ago
- Architect: Judson Newell Churchill
- NRHP reference No.: 100008811
- Added to NRHP: November 30, 2023

Barnes Avenue School is a school building located at 1028 West Barnes Avenue in Lansing, Michigan. It was listed on the National Register of Historic Places in 2023.

== History ==
In the early 20th century, the rise of the automobile and the auto factories in Lansing attracted large number of workers. Middle-class neighborhoods sprang up around the factories, and these new residents strained the capacity of the school system. In 1919, the Lansing School District raised funds to build a school in the neighborhood south of the Grand River to house kindergarten and grades one through eight. They commissioned architect Judson Newell Churchill to design the building, planning for two steps of construction. Construction immediately began on the first portion of the school, and it opened in September of the same year. The district constructed the second phase in 1920.

Soon after opening, the Lansing School District created junior high schools and Barnes shifted to serve students in grades one through six, plus kindergarten. In 1958, an all-purpose room was added to the rear of the building. The school continued to serve as a public school until the 1970s, when declining enrolment led the Lansing School District to consolidate schools. Barnes closed in 1979. Afterward, the school building became home to a series of charter schools. The latest, El-Hajj Malik El-Shabazz Academy, opened in 1995 and closed its doors in 2019.

== Description ==
The front of Barnes Avenue School is a symmetrical building, three stories high and nine bays wide. The center entrance is in a stone surround, with a stone tablet that reads "Barnes Ave School 1919" above. The middle five bays each have a window in the third floor. On the second, the center bay contains the stone tablet. The flanking bays have paired windows, while the outer of the five bays have tall, narrow window openings. The two bays on each end of the building contain tapestry brick panels with small stone corner blocks.
