= Genesee Street School =

- U.S. National Register of Historic Places
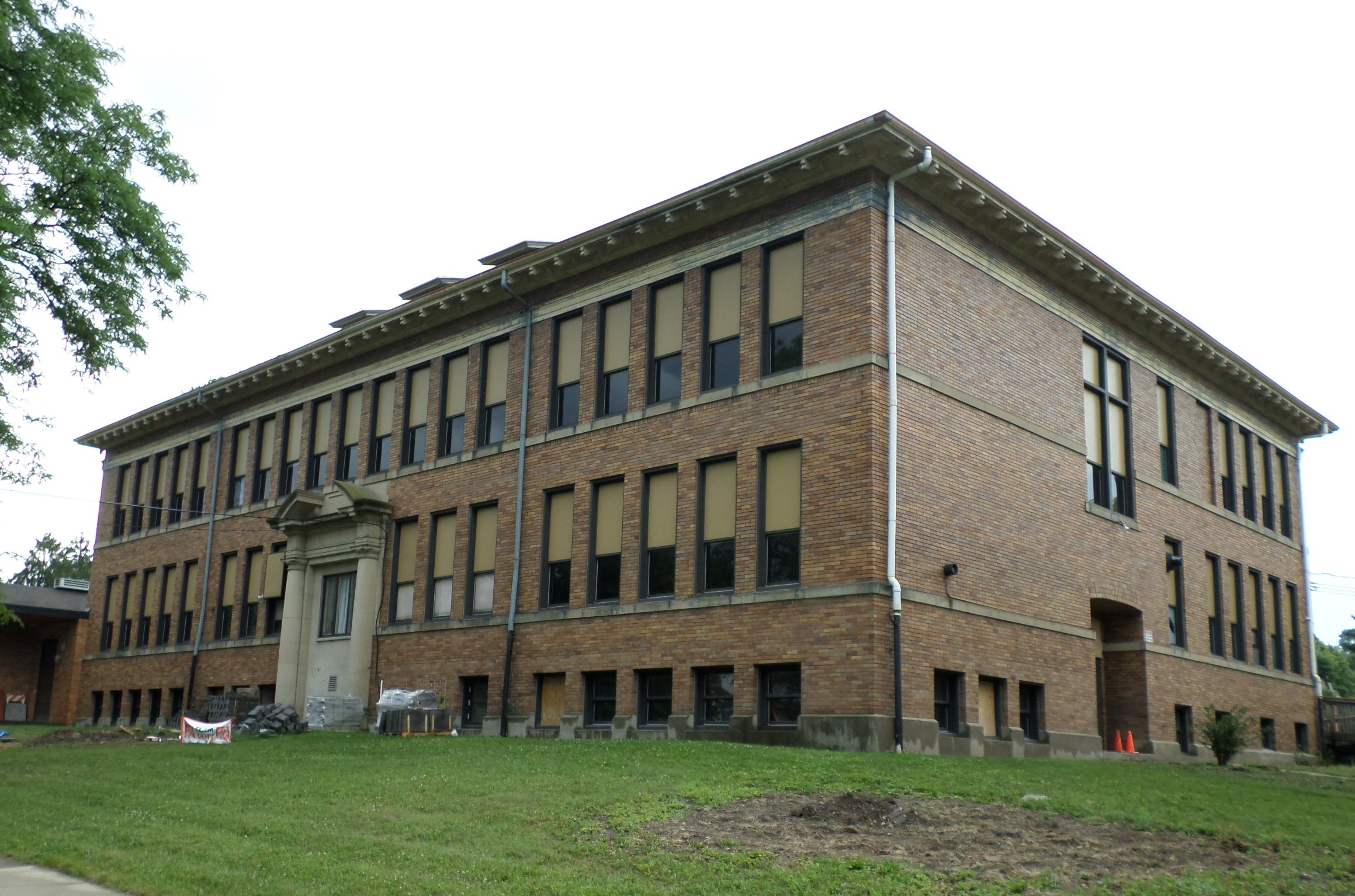
- Interactive map
- Location: 835 W. Genesee St., Lansing, Michigan
- Coordinates: 42°44′19″N 84°33′49″W
- Built: 1912
- Built by: Early, Fitzpatrick & Wilcox
- Architect: Edwyn A. Bowd, Charles V. Opdyke
- Architectural style: Neoclassical
- NRHP reference No.: 14000124
- Added to NRHP: April 7, 2014

The Genesee Street School is a school building located at 835 W. Genesee Street in Lansing, Michigan. It was listed on the National Register of Historic Places in 2014.

== History ==
The first public school in what is now Lansing opened in 1847. More schools were added, and in 1861, the Lansing School District was formed from the consolidation of three earlier districts. Lansing's population continued to grow in the 19th century, and a number of school buildings were added. Rapid growth in the early 20th century led to a large-scale school construction program, with two schools built in 1900-1910 and many more in the 1910s and 1920s. This includes the Genesee Street School, which was approved by the school board in January 1912. Voters approved a special tax to fund the school in February, and the Board selected Lansing architect Edwyn A. Bowd to design the building. The firm of Early, Fitzpatrick & Wilcox was hired to construct the school.

The school was completed in 1912, and put to use educating Lansing Public School students. Following World War II, Lansing again experienced a growth in population, and the school became overcrowded. By 1961, 340 students were attending the school, despite an official capacity of only 295. In 1962, an addition to the school was constructed, designed by architect Charles V. Opdyke of Lansing. The school remained in use by the district until 1984, when it was closed. Afterwards, the school was leased to a number of small non-profit organizations, including the Black Child and Family Institute, which occupied part of the building from 1986 until 2012. The building was sold to a private developer in 2013.

== Description ==
The Genesee Street School is a 2-1/2-story Neoclassical hip-roof building, with an attached single-story addition. It is constructed of orange-tan brick trimmed with limestone. The front facade is symmetrical, with banks of closely spaced square-head windows on all stories. The basement level contains half-height windows. A central limestone entry portico is flanked by Doric columns and has a simple entablature and broken pediment above.
