= Williamston Downtown Historic District =

- U.S. National Register of Historic Places
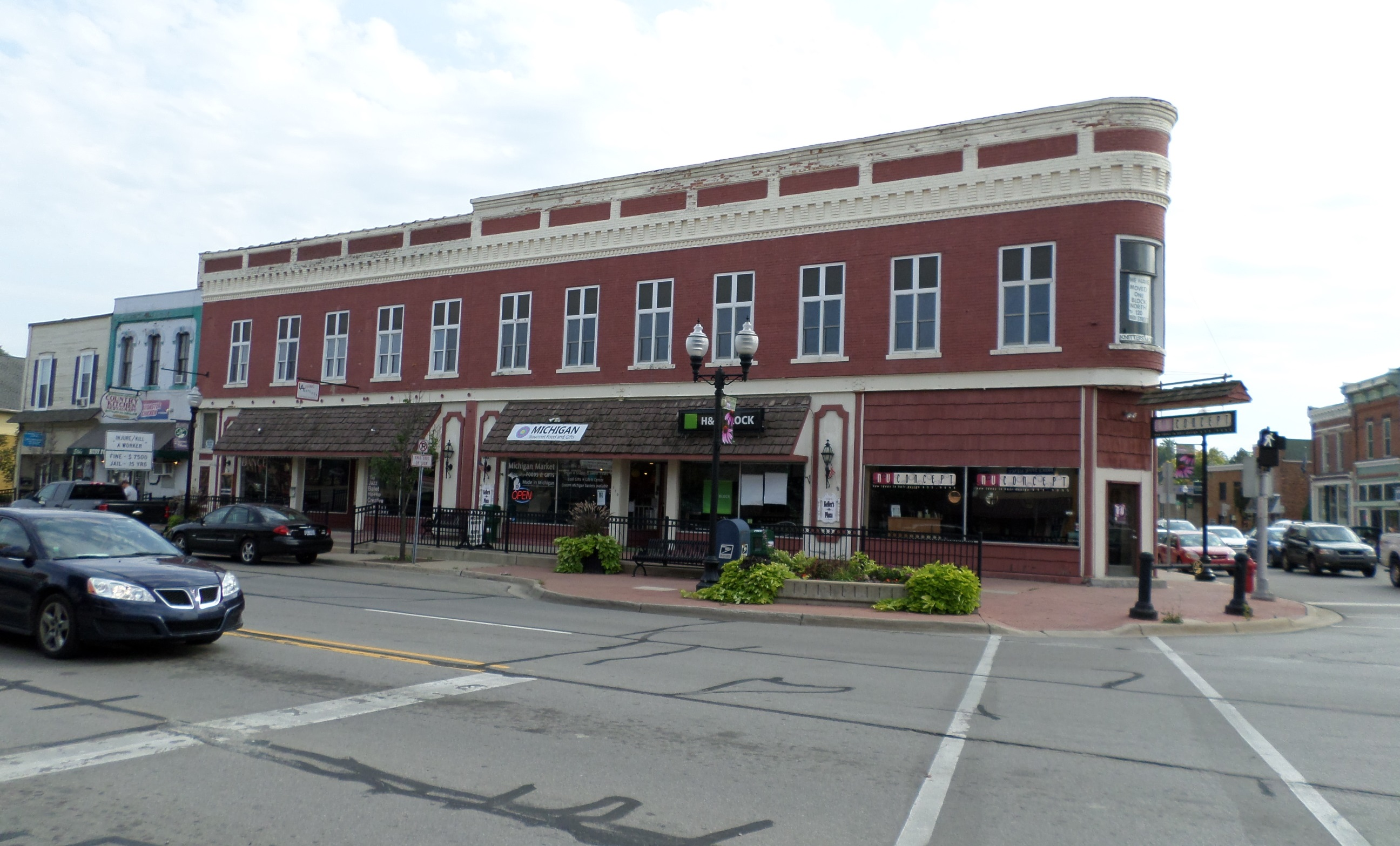
- Interactive map
- Location: 1st blocks of E. & W. Grand River Ave. & S. Putnam St., Williamston, Michigan
- Coordinates: 42°41′21″N 84°26′56″W
- Area: 8 acres (3.2 ha)
- Built: 1874
- Architect: Hiram E. Higbee, et al.
- Architectural style: Modern Movement, Late Victorian
- NRHP reference No.: 12001029
- Added to NRHP: December 12, 2012

The Williamston Downtown Historic District is a commercial historic district consisting of the first blocks of East and West Grand River Avenue, and the first block of South Putnam Street in Williamston, Michigan. The district was listed on the National Register of Historic Places in 2012.

== History ==
The area around Williamston was first settled in the late 1830s> By the early 1840s a sawmill and gristmill was in operation in the area, and a small community had grown around what is now Grand River Avenue. The first merchant arrived in 1843, and a tavern opened in 1845. That same year saw the settlement of Williamston platted out by settler Oswald B. Williams; this plat covered two blocks west of Putnam. In the early 1850s, Grand River Avenue was improved, leading to a stream of travelers and the establishment of a hotel in Williamston in 1853. The land east of Putnam was platted in 1866. In 1871, the Detroit, Howell and Lansing Railroad was completed through Williamston, resulting in an economic boom. By 1874 there was a cluster of businesses locate near the depot, and a string of retail establishments along Grand River Avenue, in the heart of the present district. Through the 1870s, the business district kept expanding, with new brick structures added to the frame buildings already extant.

Growth slowed in the 1880s, but the district changed as new brick buildings replaced to older wooden ones. This trend was accelerated by a series of fires in the 1890s and early 1900s. In the 1920s, a period of further growth was ushered in. Grand River Avenue was reconstructed and paved, and new auto-related businesses and buildings appeared in the downtown. Development led to a growth in population, and Williamston grew steadily larger from the 1920s through the 1960s. However, the construction of Interstate 96 in the early 1960s meant travelers bypassed the downtown, and the construction of Meridian Mall in the early 1970s gave shoppers an alternate destination. In the 1980s and 1990s, the businesses in the district slowly changed, with antiques stores and restaurants replacing some of the traditional commercial enterprises.

== Description ==
The Williamston Downtown Historic District contains the historic commercial buildings forming the core of the central business district, located around the intersection of Grand River Avenue and Putnam Street. The district includes 49 buildings, of which 39 contribute to the historical character of the district. Except for the City Hall, all the buildings included are commercial in nature. Structures date from the early 1870s to the 1950s, and include predominantly Italianate, Second Empire, Late Victorian, and Commercial Brick structures. Buildings are one or two stories in height, with the exception of three three-story buildings near the intersection of Grand River and Putnam. The buildings are predominantly constructed of masonry, most in red brick.

Visually, the district is dominated by the Victorian era buildings. Near the four corners of the intersection of Grand River and Putnam stand four of the district's largest and most architecturally distinguished commercial blocks, all of them from the Victorian era. These include the Italianate style Bowerman Block and the Second Empire style National block, both dating from 1874, and the district's two oldest documented buildings. Also at the intersection are the 1887 Andrews Hotel and the 1899 Leasia Building.
