= Walter H. French Junior High School =

- U.S. National Register of Historic Places
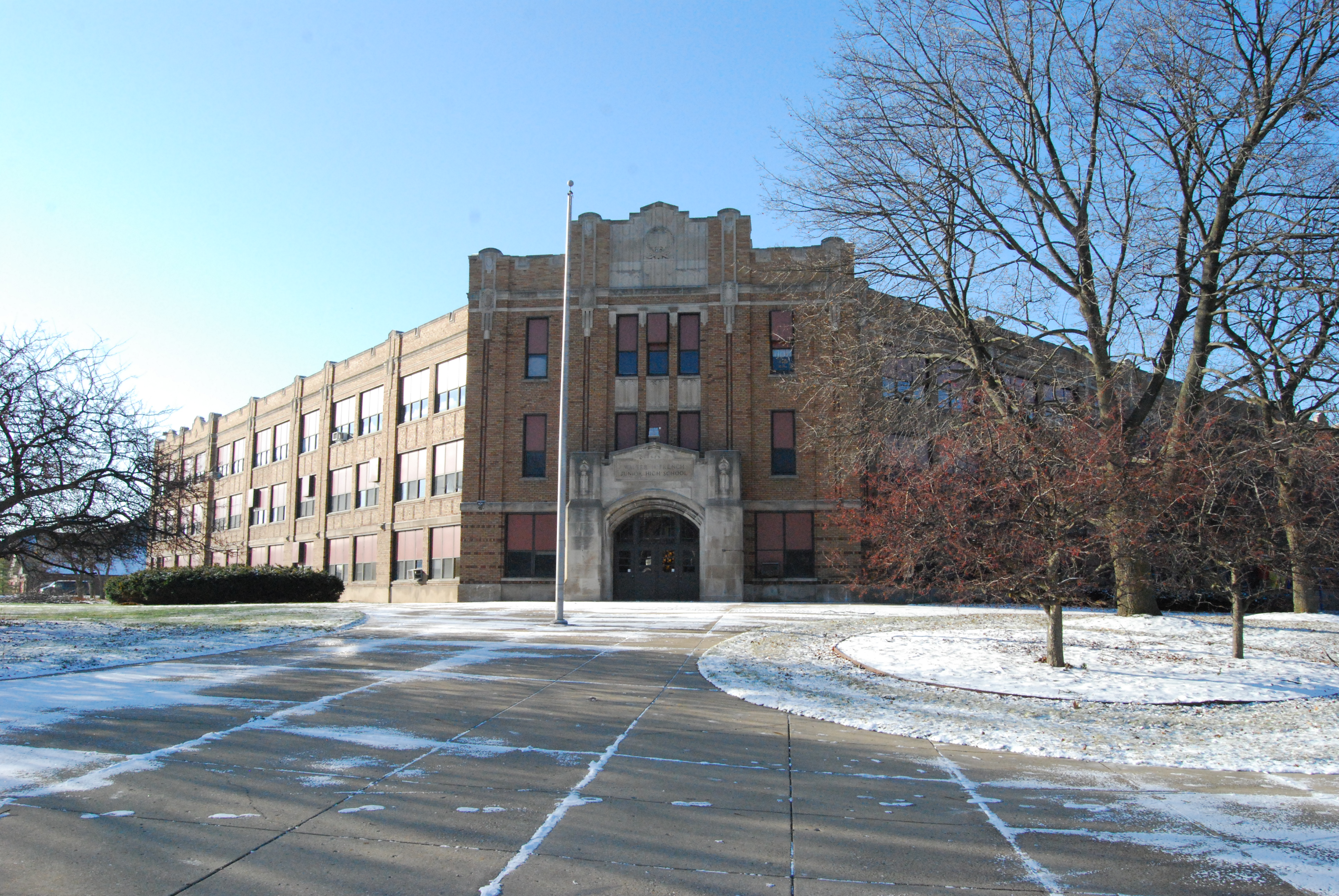
- Walter French Academy as seen from the corner of Mt. Hope and Cedar

- Location within Michigan Location within the United States
- Interactive map
- Location: 1900 S. Cedar St., Lansing, Michigan
- Coordinates: 42.7114°N 84.5486°W
- Built: 1925
- Architect: Judson N. Churchill
- Architectural style: Tudor
- NRHP reference No.: 14001097
- Added to NRHP: December 30, 2014

The Walter French Junior High School, formerly known as the Walter French Academy or the Walter French Academy of Business and Technology, is a three-story school building located at the corner of Mount Hope and Cedar in Lansing, Michigan. It was listed on the National Register of Historic Places in 2014.

== History ==
In the 1910s and 1920, the booming automobile business expanded Lansing's population, and the schools became overcrowded. Several new subdivisions on the south side of Lansing caused the school overcrowding there to become acute, and in 1924, the Lansing School Board acquired a six-acre lot on which to build a school. The Board hired local architect Judson N. Churchill to design a building. Construction began in late 1924, and the school was completed in time for classes in 1925. It had space for grades seven through nine, and additional space for grades one through six.

In 1950, the school was converted to be completely a junior high, and in 1957 a new wing was added. However, falling enrollment caused the school to be closed in 1981. In 1983, the Eyde company purchased the school building.

In 1996 the building re-opened as a charter school, the Walter French Academy of Business and Technology, which included a middle and high school. About four years later, sometime between 1999 and 2000, it added a K-12 program to become the "...first local public school to offer kindergarten through 12th grade under one roof." In 2004, the school lost ties to its authorizer, Central Michigan University and was ultimately shut down that year due to financial problems. On August 5, 2016 the building caught fire; the cause of the fire was unknown.

In January 2018, the families of Louis and George Eyde donated the building to the Capital Area Housing Partnership, a non-profit affordable housing group. The organization plans to redevelop the building for housing.

== Description ==
The Walter H. French Junior High School is a three-story, steel-frame brick building constructed in a Tudor style with a flat roof and large window bays. The exterior features elaborate stone door surrounds and intricate polychromatic brickwork in red, yellow, and brown shades. Another wing projects to the rear; this wing was enlarged with additions in 1957 and in the 1970s. A limestone base rises to the sill level of the first floor windows, and there is a stone belt course between the first and second stories. The main building has two wings, meeting at a right angle with a three-bay angled facade at the intersection. The formal entry is at this intersection, through an elliptical arch. A secondary entrance is at one end of one of the wings.
