= Lansing Woman's Club Building =

- U.S. National Register of Historic Places
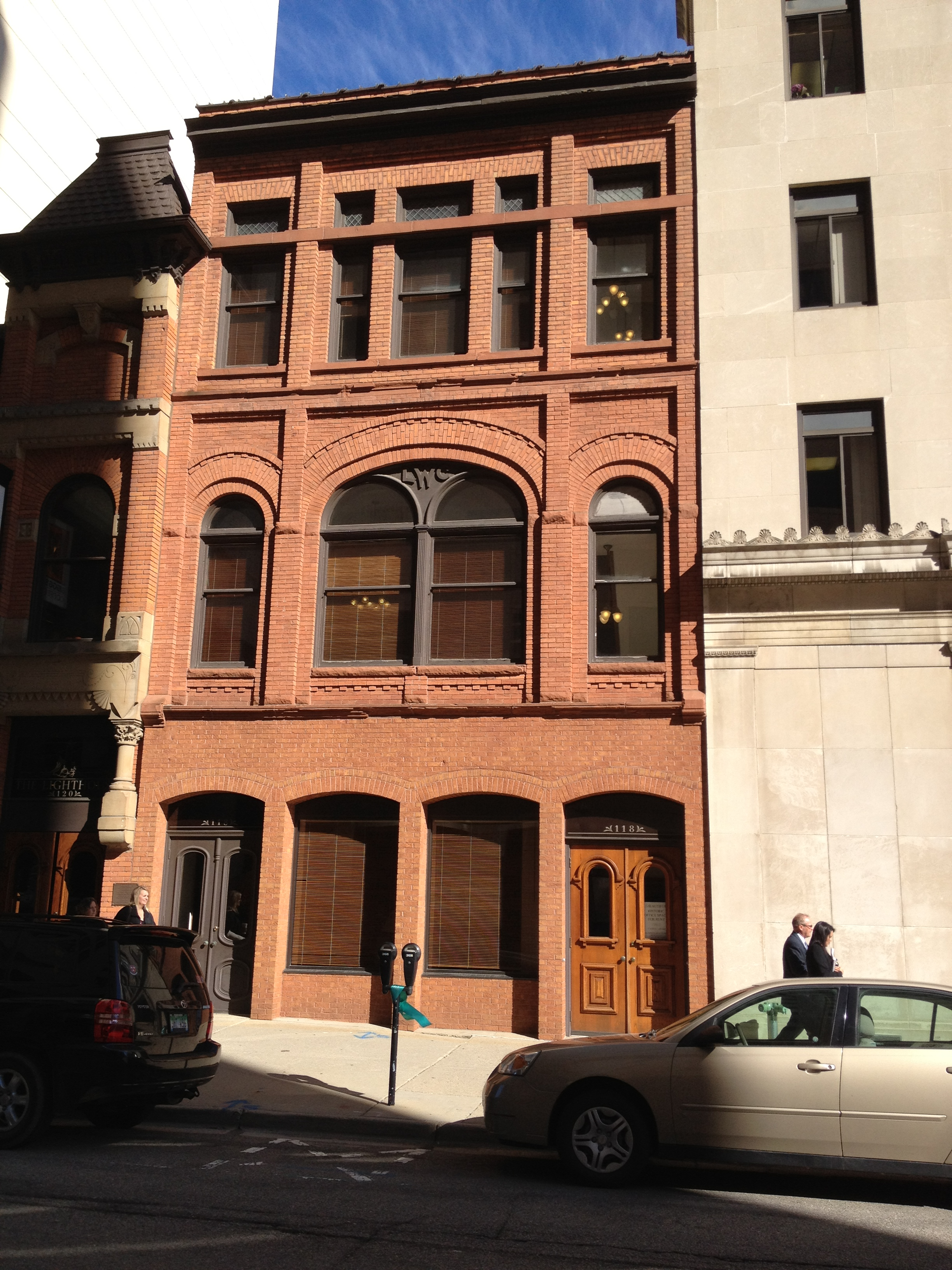
- Interactive map
- Location: 118 W. Ottawa St., Lansing, Michigan
- Coordinates: 42°44′05″N 84°33′11″W
- Area: less than one acre
- Built: 1889
- Architect: James Appleyard
- Architectural style: Romanesque, Richardsonian Romanesque
- MPS: Downtown Lansing MRA
- NRHP reference No.: 80001867
- Added to NRHP: September 17, 1980

The Lansing Woman's Club Building is a social and commercial building located at 118 West Ottawa Street in Lansing, Michigan. It was listed on the National Register of Historic Places in 1980. It is the only known remaining building in Lansing designed by local architect James Appleyard.

== History ==
The Lansing Women's Club was founded in 1874 to provide educational and cultural opportunities to local women. The club rented space in various buildings, then in 1889 commissioned local architect James Appleyard to design a new structure. The original building was constructed in 1889-1890 and contained two stories: the upper for club rooms and the lower rental office space. In 1912, the club had a third story constructed, moving their spaces to the new floor and renting out the second as office space. The Lansing Woman's Club used the space until 1949, and in 1952 purchased a new building at 624 West Ottawa Street. The club maintained ownership of the original building until 1972. The building was extensively rehabilitated in 1980.

== Description ==
The Lansing Woman's Club is a three-story, Richardsonian Romanesque red brick block. It is a narrow and deep, located between two other office buildings. The building was originally two stories tall, with a third story added in 1912. The first floor was originally divided into four bays by brick piers; this was later rebuilt with aluminum and black glass. The present storefront of segmental-arch openings between brick piers was constructed during the 1979-80 renovation.
