= Reo Motor Car Company Plant =

- Formerly listed on the U.S. National Register of Historic Places
- Former U.S. National Historic Landmark
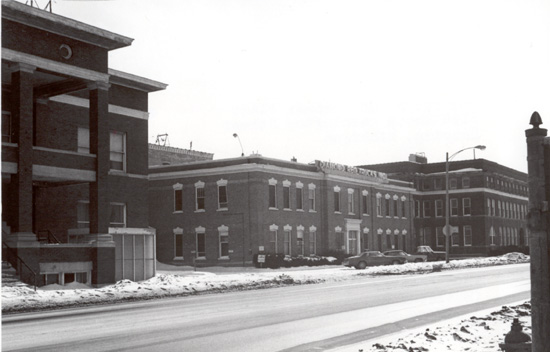
- Reo clubhouse, factory, and engineering building, 1977
- Location: 2100 S. Washington St., Lansing, Michigan
- Area: 16.5 acres (6.7 ha)
- Built: 1904
- Built by: Ransom E. Olds
- Demolished: 1980
- NRHP reference No.: 78001500

Significant dates
- Added to NRHP: June 2, 1978
- Removed from NRHP: March 5, 1986

The Reo Motor Car Company Plant was an automotive manufacturing factory, built for the REO Motor Car Company, located at 2100 South Washington Street Lansing, Michigan. It was designated a National Historic Landmark (NHL) and listed on the National Register of Historic Places (NRHP) in 1978, but completely demolished by the beginning of 1980. It was delisted from the NRHP in 1986.

== History ==
Ransom Eli Olds became a partner in his father's machine shop in 1885. He soon developed an interest in self-propelled vehicles, experimenting with steam vehicles in the late 1880s, and switching to gasoline-powered vehicles in 1896. In 1897 he renamed his father's company the Olds Gasoline Engine Works, and founded the Olds Motor Vehicle Company to manufacture automobiles in Lansing. The vehicle company floundered, and in 1899 Olds liquidated it and started a new company, the Olds Motor Works. His financial backer, lumber magnate Samuel L. Smith, insisted production move from Lansing to Detroit. In 1901 Olds brought out the low-priced Curved Dash model, which was a wild success, and the company was selling over 5000 per year by 1904.

However, tension between Olds and Smith was high, and in 1904 Smith ousted Olds from the company. In August 1904, Olds founded a competing company, the R.E. Olds Motor Car Company, which soon changed its name to REO Motor Car Company to avoid a lawsuit. The company constructed a factory complex for production of automobiles. An office building and a factory, were begun immediately, and construction was completed in 1905. Business took off, and soon Olds added another story to the factory, then three smaller factory buildings. In 1908, an engineering building was added, and in 1914 another large factory. An employee clubhouse was added in 1917.

By 1907, the company was one of the top four brands in the United States, but faded later as industrial giants like Ford Motor Company and General Motors gained market share. The company added a truck line in 1910, but still remained small. Olds himself turned over management of the company to his protegee Richard H. Scott in 1915, and the REO brand remained small but profitable through 1925. Over the next decade, a series of ill-advised decisions caused the company serious financial problems. It abandoned automobiles in favor of truck production in 1936. The need for trucks during World War II buoyed the company for some time, but it was sold in 1954 to the Bohn Aluminum and Brass Corporation, then became a part of the White Motor Company. It merged with Diamond T Trucks in 1967 to become Diamond Reo Trucks, but lasted only until 1975, when the firm declared bankruptcy.

After bankruptcy, the Reo Motor Car Company Plant remained vacant. The buildings were completely demolished by early 1980.

== Description ==
The most historically significant buildings in the Reo Motor Car Company Plant were the 1905 factory and office building, the three small c. 1906 factories, the 1908 engineering building, the 1914 factory, and the 1917 employee clubhouse. All of these buildings were brick structures on concrete foundations, with flat or monitored roofs.

=== 1905 factory ===
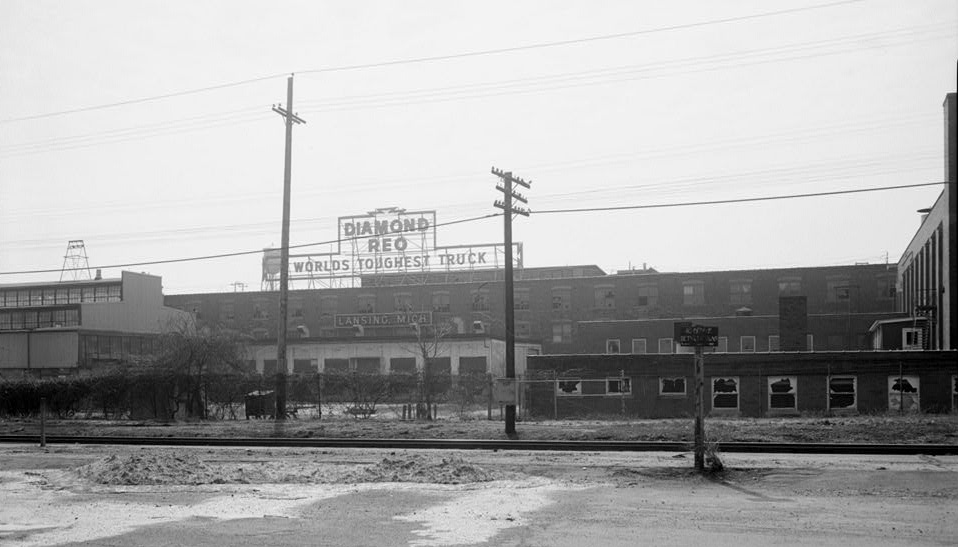

The first factory was a three-story flat-roofed red brick building, measuring 72 feet by 543 feet. It was originally two stories high, but a third story was added shortly after the original construction. The walls were of plain brick set in American bond with brick corbeling along the roofline. The windows were double-hung one-over-one sash-type units are set in rectangular surrounds capped by rounded stone arches.

=== 1905 office ===
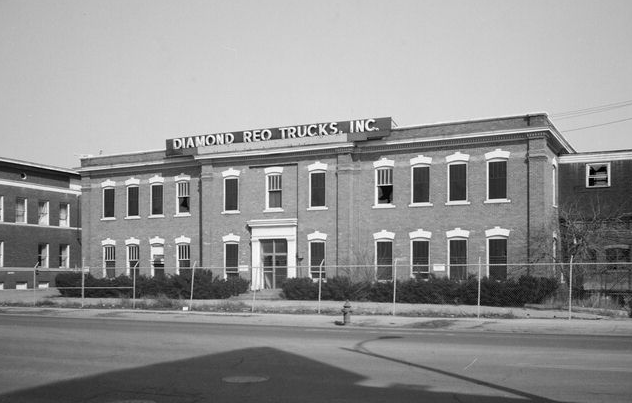

The office building was a two-story, rectangular brick structure with a flat roof, measuring 50 feet by 100 feet, which directly adjoined the factory. The front facade had a central entrance pavilion topped with an overhanging entablature and flanked by slightly protruding brick pilasters, with additional pilasters at the corners. It had arched window surrounds with sash-type windows and stone sills.

=== c. 1906 factories ===
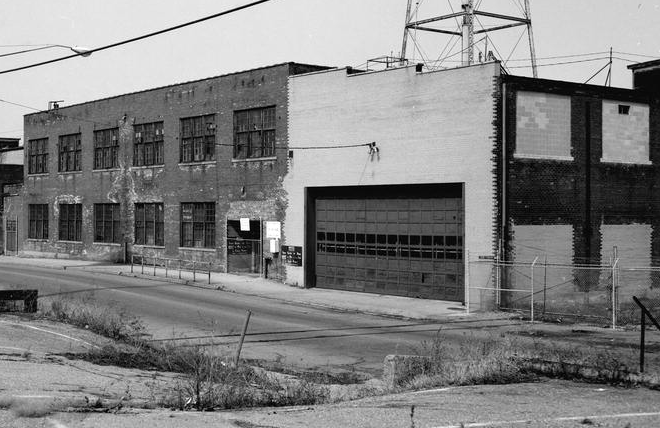

The three smaller factory buildings, located near the 1905 factory, were expanded in sections between about 1906 and 1919. They were two-story structures, similar in design to the 1905 factory, but much shorter. All three were constructed of brick with concrete foundations, and had a combination of flat and monitored roofs. The windows were double-hung units set in rounded arches.

=== 1908 engineering building ===
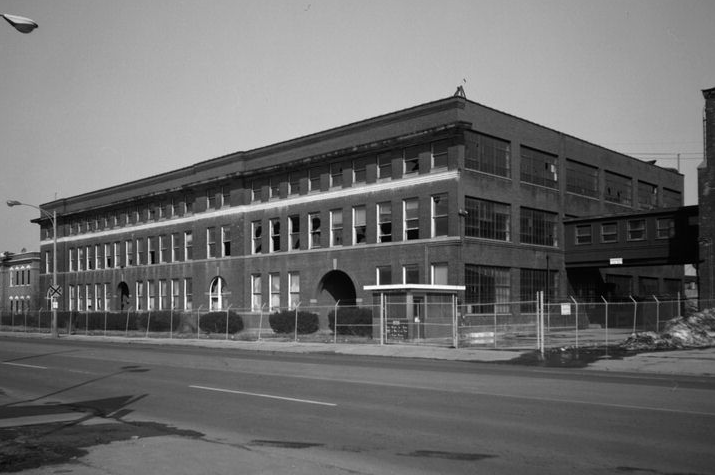

The engineering building was a three-story brick structure near the office. It had string courses at the base of the first and second story windows, and a heavy stone course at the base of the third story. It was topped with a wood cornice near and a heavy roof pediment. On either end of the front facade were center-pointed Norman arch windows in an arched entrance of similar design. The remaining windows were one-over-one sash units set in rectangular surrounds.

=== 1914 factory ===
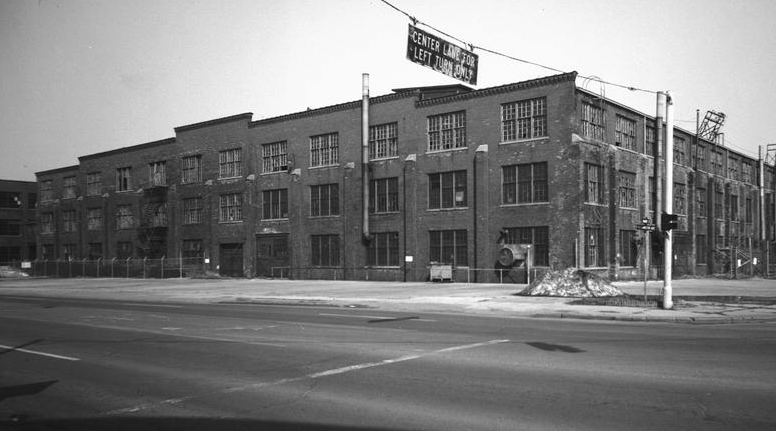

This factory was a three-story brick structure located near the Engineering Building. It was a rectangular structure with a full basement and a stepped-gable roof decorated with brick corbeling. The building had projecting buttresses with concrete caps and triple-hung windows in metal frames.

=== 1917 clubhouse ===
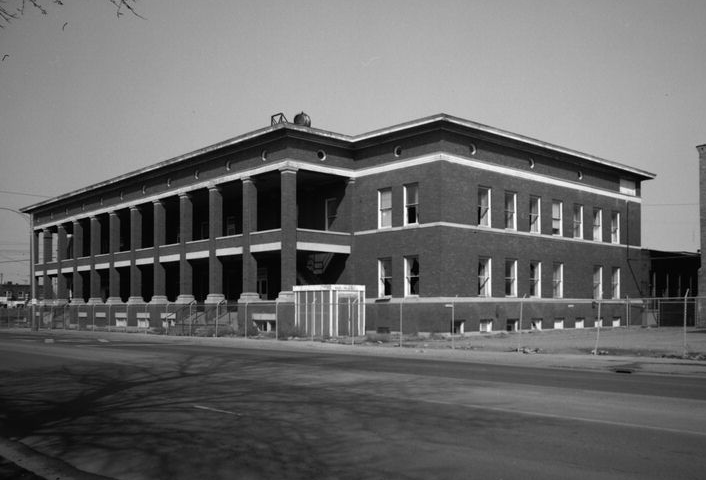

The clubhouse was a two-story flat-roofed brick structure with a gigantic veranda ad a raised full basement, located near the office building. It measured 72 feet by 192 feet. The building had narrow stone beltcourses at the base of the first and second stories, and a heavy stone beltcourse near the roofline. There were circular between the heavy stone course and the roofline and a cornice above. The windows were one-over-one wood sash units in rectangular surrounds, with stone sills.
