= The Arbaugh =

- Arbaugh's Department Store Building
- U.S. National Register of Historic Places
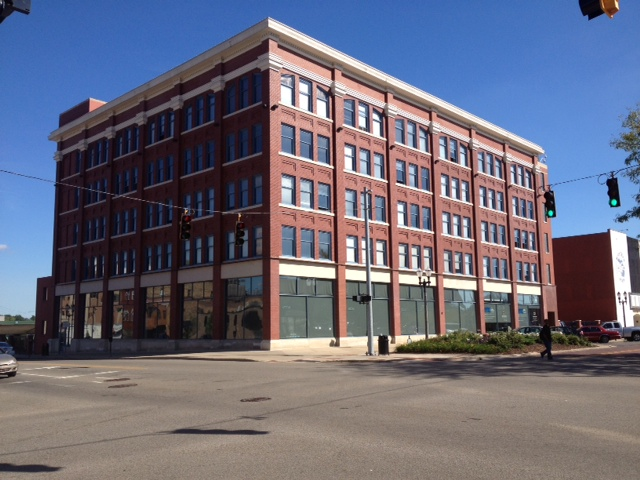
- Interactive map
- Location: 401 S. Washington, Lansing, Michigan
- Coordinates: 42°43′46″N 84°33′07″W
- Area: less than one acre
- Built: 1905
- Architect: Edwyn A. Bowd
- Architectural style: Early Commercial
- NRHP reference No.: 07000748
- Added to NRHP: July 20, 2007

The Arbaugh is a mixed-use building containing 48 loft-style apartments, which was originally built as a department store. The building is located at 401 South Washington in Lansing, Michigan. The building was listed on the National Register of Historic Places in 2007.

== History ==
Arbaugh's Department Store was founded in 1891 by J. M. Cameron, who soon brought his nephew, Basil C. Cameron, as an assistant. Basil's college roommate, Frank N. Arbaugh, moved to Lansing in 1896 to become a clerk at the store. The next year, J. M. Cameron sold his share of the business to Arbaugh, and the firm became Cameron & Arbaugh. The store flourished, and in 1902 Cameron & Arbaugh purchased the lot on which this building stands. In 1904, they started plans to construct a new building, moving the house that was previously on the property. The building was likely designed by local architect Edwyn A. Bowd. Construction started in early 1905, and the new store opened in October of that year.

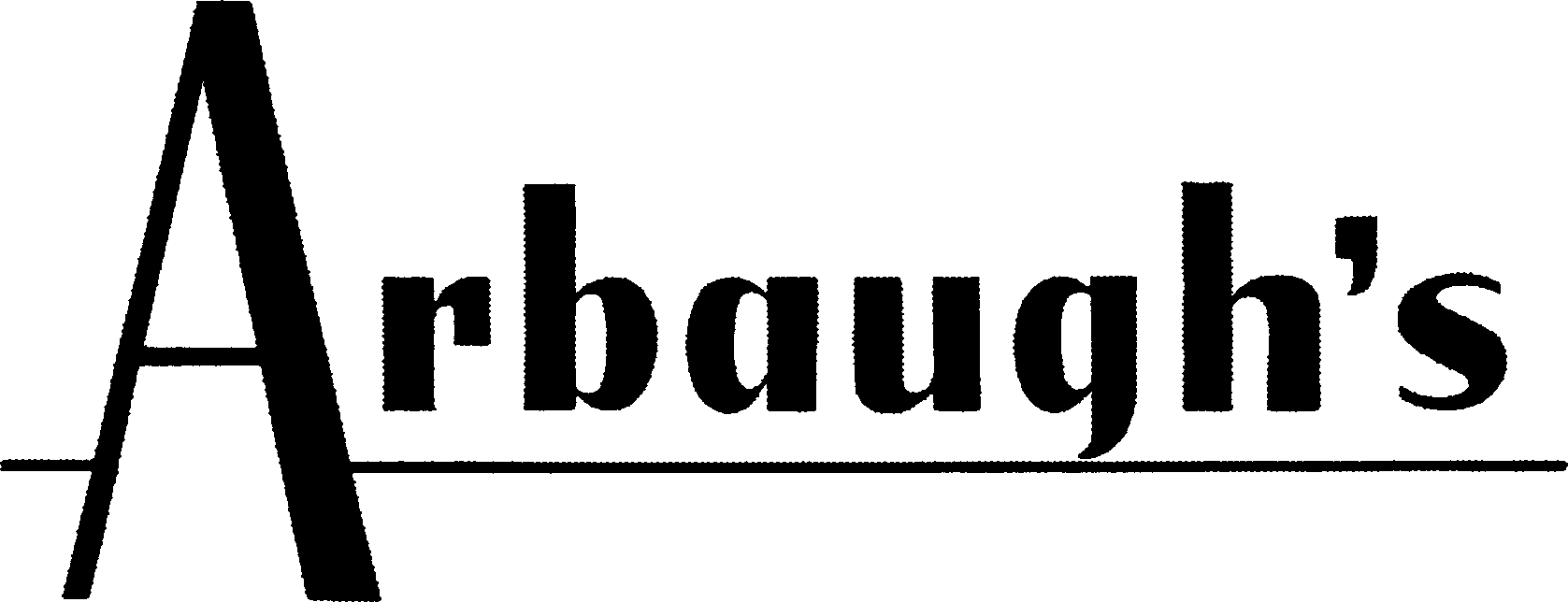
Arbaugh's Department Store Logo

In 1909, Frank Arbaugh bought Basil Cameron's share of the store, and the business became the F. N. Arbaugh Company (or simply Arbaugh's). In 1915, a matching addition was constructed on the building, doubling its size. The store survived through the Great Depression, and in 1953 Arbaugh sold the company to Sperry & Hutchinson of New York, who also owned Wurzburg Department Stores in Grand Rapids, Michigan. Arbaugh resigned later that year, and died in 1955. The store operated under the Arbaugh's Department Store name until 1969, when it changed to the Wurzburg's name. The store was closed in 1972.

The Arbaugh family had retained ownership of the building after selling the store, and in 1974 sold the building to Lansing automobile dealer Karl Story, who remodeled it into offices. In 2002, the building became vacant, and in 2004 it was rehabilitated for use as apartments and commercial office space.

== Description ==
The Arbaugh is a five-story red brick building with sandstone trim standing on a corner lot. The two main facades are identical, and are each divided into six bays by brick piers. Each bay contains large storefront windows on the ground floor, and three side-by-side double-hung windows in the upper floors, with the tops of the fifth-floor windows forming a segmental arch. A classical cornice tops the building.
