= Stockbridge Town Hall =

- U.S. National Register of Historic Places
- Michigan State Historic Site
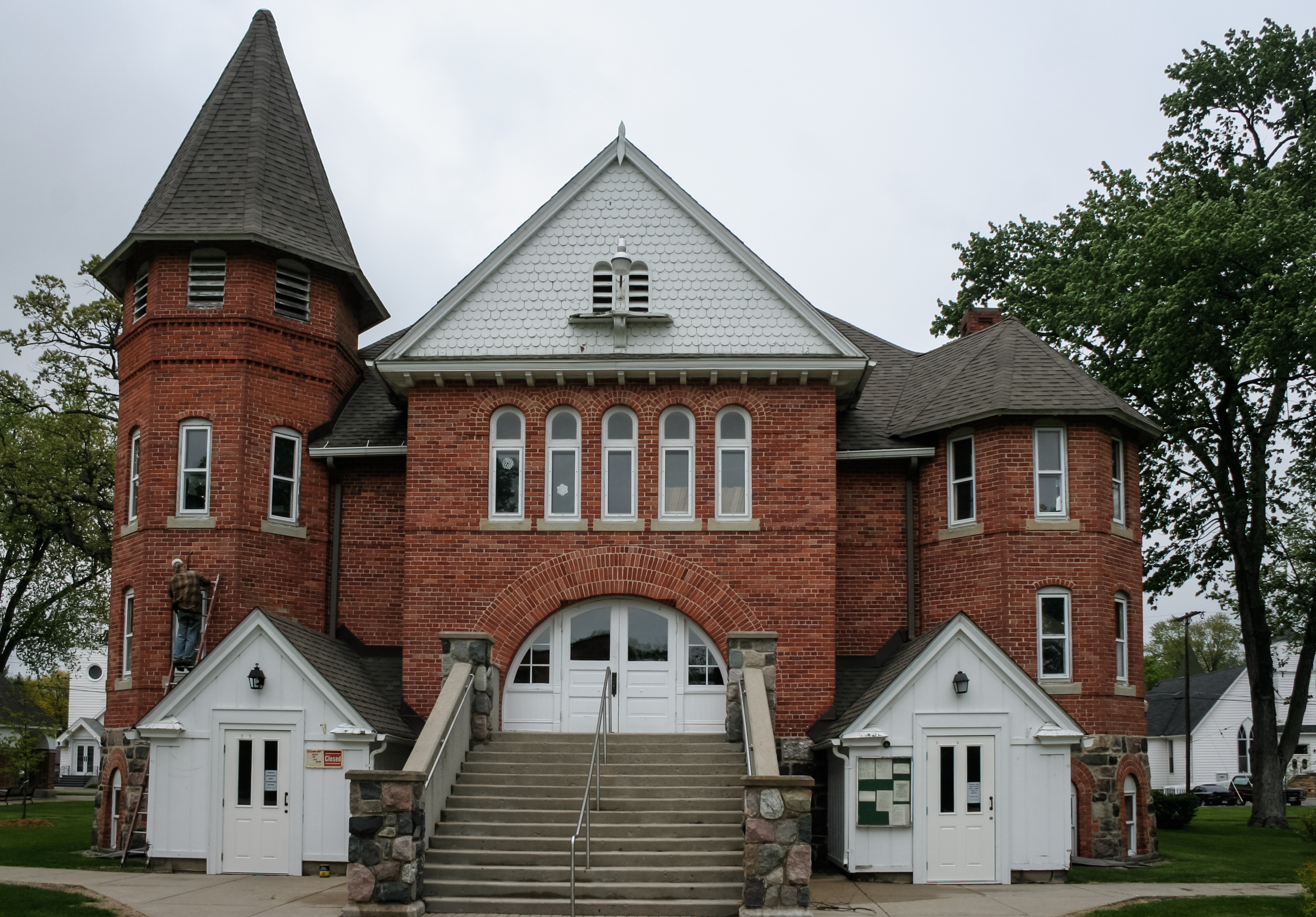
- Interactive map
- Location: 101 S. Clinton St., Stockbridge, Michigan
- Coordinates: 42°27′02″N 84°10′46″W
- Area: 2.5 acres (1.0 ha)
- Built: 1892
- Architect: Elijah E. Myers
- NRHP reference No.: 80001872
- Added to NRHP: March 10, 1980

The Stockbridge Town Hall is a government building located at 101 South Clinton Street in Stockbridge, Michigan. It was listed on the National Register of Historic Places in 1980.

== History ==
Settlement in Stockbridge Township began in 1834, and the township itself was established as a governmental unit in 1836. The village of Stockbridge was platted in 1842, but grew slowly until the construction of the railroad in the 1880s. Until that time, township meetings were held in a school house, or the town clerk's office, but with the 1880s growth came a need for a dedicated town hall. Voters authorized construction of a building, and architect Elijah E. Myers was hired to draft plans for the building. Construction began in 1892 and was completed the following year.

The building contained an auditorium which was designed as a community gathering place for stage productions and lectures. The auditorium has been used as a movie house in the 1940s and a concert venue in the 1960s. The building was restored in 1982. It is still used by the township.

== Description ==
The Stockbridge Town Hall is an asymmetrical two-story, red brick, hip-roof structure on a high cut stone foundation. The main facade has two octagonal corner towers, one turreted and a full story taller than the other one. In between is a shingled end-gable entrance pavilion with a broad, arched entrance approached by a staircase. The staircase is flanked by clapboarded sheds which cover stairs down to basement-level entrances. The side elevations both have a slightly projecting central gable containing a broad, round-head window, and flanking, smaller round-head windows.

The interior contains two rooms in the basement used for township offices, and a larger open area used for meetings and voting. The basement also contains a furnace room, bathrooms, and a kitchen located in a former lobby. The upper floor is entirely filled with an auditorium, and its associated entrance hall. The auditorium is a square space with a stage at one end and a gallery above the entrance hall. The stage contains a c. 1910 painted roll curtain, depicting a scene on the shore of a mountain lake.
