= List of Michigan State Historic Sites in Ingham County =

Location of Ingham County in Michigan

The following is a list of Michigan State Historic Sites in Ingham County, Michigan. Sites marked with a dagger (†) are also listed on the National Register of Historic Places in Ingham County, Michigan. Those with a double dagger (‡) are also designated National Historic Landmarks.

== Current listings ==
Name	Image	Location	City	Listing date
Andrews Hotel		100-108 West Grand River Avenue	Williamston	June 6, 1977
Charles Bachman House		929 Roxburgh Avenue	East Lansing	April 28, 1987
Bank of Lansing		101-103 North Washington Avenue	Lansing	July 26, 1978
Barrett Building		111 West Grand River Avenue	Williamston	July 26, 1978
Bates and Edmonds Engine Company		240 Museum Drive	Lansing	June 15, 1984
Beal Botanical Garden		Campus of Michigan State University	East Lansing	May 17, 1973
Louis Beck House		515 N Capitol Avenue	Lansing	November 15, 1990
George Beeman House		3150 South Williamston Road	Williamston	February 23, 1981
Bigelow-Kuhn House		334 North Hagadorn Road	East Lansing	August 24, 1978
Birthplace of Oldsmobile Division Commemorative Designation		920 Townsend Street	Lansing	May 15, 1987
Brown-Price House†		1003 North Washington Avenue	Lansing	September 21, 1983
Capital Bank Tower†		124 W. Allegan St.	Lansing	December 6, 2005
Central Methodist Episcopal Church†		215 North Capitol Avenue	Lansing	March 19, 1980
Central School†		325 West Grand River Avenue	East Lansing	December 19, 1984
Chief Okemos / Okemos Village		Southeast corner of Okemos Road and Hamilton Road	Okemos	2004
Church of the Resurrection and School		1529 East Michigan Avenue	Lansing	March 16, 1989
College Hall Informational Site		Campus of Michigan State University, W Circle Dr, across from the Main Library	East Lansing	March 25, 1955
Collins Memorial A.M.E. Church		3500 West Holmes Road	Lansing	January 13, 1982
Frank E. Cooley House	Frank E. Cooley House	213 W Malcolm X St	Lansing	March 19, 1980
Benjamin F. Davis House (Demolished; NR delisted, 1972)		528 South Washington Avenue	Lansing	August 13, 1971
East Lansing Commemorative Designation		410 Abbott Road, City Hall	East Lansing	July 15, 1993
Ethel Apartments		117 South Hosmer Street	Lansing	January 16, 1990
Eustace Hall†		470 W. Circle Dr.	East Lansing	March 3, 1971
Roswell Everett House		131 West Miller Road	Lansing	August 29, 1996
Edward Ferris House		3044 South Onondaga Road	Onondaga	December 17, 1987
First Baptist Church of Leslie		204 East Bellevue Street	Leslie	May 18, 1989
First Capitol in Lansing Informational Site		South Washington Square, on boulevard between Allegan and Washtenaw	Lansing	March 19, 1987
First Presbyterian Church Commemorative Designation		510 West Ottawa Street	Lansing	October 23, 1987
Charles Fitch House		103 North Jefferson Street	Mason	June 10, 1980
Franklin Avenue Presbyterian Church†		108 West Grand River Avenue	Lansing	December 5, 1986
Grand River Informational Site		East bank of the Grand River in Riverfront Park, between Shiawassee and Saginaw streets	Lansing	July 19, 1990
Grand River Trail Informational Designation		Roadside Park on Grand River Avenue (M-43) at the Red Cedar River, approximately four miles west of Williamston	Williamston	July 19, 1956
Grand Trunk Western Rail Station, Lansing Depot†		1203 South Washington Avenue	Lansing	April 11, 1977
Bert F. Hammond House		1720 Noble Road	Williamston	December 15, 1988
Haslett Commemorative Designation		1427 Haslett Road	Haslett	October 1, 1971
John T. Herrmann House		520 North Capitol Avenue	Lansing	July 23, 1987
Kerns Hotel Informational Designation		East side of Grand Avenue between Michigan Avenue and Ottawa Street	Lansing	October 23, 1987
Morgan B. Hungerford House		602 West Ionia Street	Lansing	August 24, 1984
Ingham County Courthouse†		315 South Jefferson Street	Mason	May 18, 1971
Intersection of Base Line with the Principal Meridian Informational Designation		Meridian-Baseline State Park, Ingham and Jackson County	Leslie Township	November 27, 1956
Lansing (Town of Michigan) Informational Site		City Hall, 124 W Michigan Avenue, NE corner of Michigan and Capitol avenues	Lansing	March 21, 1991
Lansing Community College Commemorative Designation		610 North Capitol Avenue	Lansing	August 21, 1987
Lansing Fire Station No. 8		2300 Michigan Avenue	Lansing	January 8, 1981
Lansing City Market		325 City Market Drive	Lansing	May 19, 1988
Lansing No. 7 Fire House		629 North Jenison Avenue	Lansing	March 19, 1980
LeRoy Township District No. 6 School		202 North Main Street	Webberville	November 18, 1993
Library Museum - Michigan State University (Linton Hall)		West Circle Drive - Campus of Michigan State University	East Lansing	September 10, 1979
Malcolm X Homesite (Vincent Court Apartments) Informational Site		4705 South Martin Luther King Jr Boulevard	Lansing	February 21, 1975
Masonic Temple†		217 South Capitol Avenue	Lansing	May 15, 1987
Masonic Temple Building†		314 M.A.C. Avenue	East Lansing	January 18, 2001
Michigan Association of Counties Informational Designation		935 North Washington Avenue	Lansing	January 17, 1991
Michigan Automobile Dealers Association Informational Designation		1500 Kendale Boulevard	East Lansing	September 16, 1986
Michigan Education Association Building		935 North Washington Avenue	Lansing	October 27, 1983
Michigan Licensed Beverage Association Informational Designation		920 North Fairview Avenue	Lansing	July 20, 1989
Michigan Manufacturers Association Informational Designation		620 South Capitol Avenue	Lansing	September 26, 1987
Michigan Millers Mutual Fire Insurance Company Informational Designation		2425 East Grand River Avenue	Lansing	June 30, 1988
Michigan Pharmacists Association Informational Designation		408 Kalamazoo Plaza	Lansing	September 24, 1984
Michigan Retail Hardware Association Informational Designation		4414 South Pennsylvania Avenue	Lansing	February 21, 1991
Michigan School for the Blind Complex		715 West Willow Street	Lansing	April 10, 1986
Michigan Sheriffs' Association Informational Designation		620 South Capitol Avenue	Lansing	November 15, 1990
Michigan Society of Optometrists Informational Designation		530 West Ionia Street	Lansing	April 28, 1987
Michigan Society of Professional Engineers Informational Designation		215 North Walnut Street	Lansing	January 22, 1987
Michigan State Capitol‡		Capitol Avenue at Michigan Avenue	Lansing	February 18, 1956
Michigan State Dental Association Informational Designation		3657 Okemos Road	Okemos	March 16, 1989
Michigan State Medical Society Headquarters Building		120 Saginaw	East Lansing	December 9, 1994
Michigan State Police Headquarters Complex (Demolished)		714 Harrison Road	East Lansing	February 17, 1994
Michigan State University Laboratory Row		East and West Circle Drives, Campus of Michigan State University	East Lansing	September 12, 1979
Michigan's First Rural Electric Line Informational Designation		M-36 East of Meridian Road	Dansville vicinity	August 23, 1956
Darius B. Moon House†		216 Huron Street	Lansing	August 6, 1976
North Lansing Historic Commercial District†		100 to 300 blocks of Grand River & 1200 block of Turner Street	Lansing	June 18, 1976
Okemos Methodist Church Commemorative Designation		4734 Okemos Road	Okemos	July 15, 1993
Olds Mansion (Demolished)		720 South Washington Avenue	Lansing	June 2, 1966
Orchard Street Pump House		368 Orchard Street	East Lansing	October 21, 1975
George E. Palmer/Old Newsboys Commemorative Designation		Northeast corner of West Michigan Avenue and North Grand Avenue	Lansing	February 17, 1994
Penfil Apartments		108-110 South Hosmer Street	Lansing	January 16, 1990
Phoenix Mill		200 State Street	Mason	August 3, 1979
Pink School House		707 West Ash Street	Mason	August 24, 1978
Pioneer Cemetery		2332 Aurelius Road	Holt	November 16, 1995
Plymouth Congregational Church Informational Designation		2001 East Grand River Avenue	East Lansing	March 16, 1989
President's House / No. 7 Faculty Row		1 Abbott Rd, south side of West Circle Drive, Campus of Michigan State University	East Lansing	September 25, 1985
Alonzo Proctor Toll House		564 North Hagadorn (now located in the Meridian Historical Village)	Okemos	March 14, 1973
John Rayner House†		725 East Ash Street	Mason	June 15, 1979
Reeve's Mill		M-36 East of Brogan Road	Stockbridge Township	February 18, 1982
REO Motor Car Company Commemorative Designation		2100 Washington Street	Lansing	February 29, 1996
Herbert M. Rogers House		528 North Capitol Avenue	Lansing	January 20, 1984
Sts. Cornelius and Cyprian Church		1320 Catholic Church Road	Leslie	2014
St. Katherine's Chapel†		4650 Meridian Road	Williamstown Township	February 23, 1969
Saint Mary Parish Commemorative Designation		157 High Street	Williamston	July 21, 1994
Saint Paul's Episcopal Church		218 W Ottawa St	Lansing	November 16, 1989
Saint Thomas Aquinas Parish Commemorative Designation		955 Alton Road	East Lansing	February 25, 1988
Dr. James F. Smiley House		2142 Hamilton Road	Okemos	February 19, 1987
Smith–Turner House†		326 West Grand River Avenue	Lansing	April 15, 1977
State Bar of Michigan Informational Designation		306 Townsend Street	Lansing	April 28, 1987
Stockbridge Town Hall†		125 South Clinton Street	Stockbridge	1987
Strand Theatre and Arcade†		211-219 South Washington Avenue	Lansing	May 24, 2001
Turner House		505 N Washington Square	Lansing	November 16, 1989
Turner-Dodge House†		106 East North Street	Lansing	May 17, 1973
Union Depot†		637 E. Michigan Ave.	Lansing	July 21, 1995
Union Hall Building		100 South Main Street	Leslie	November 16, 1981
Veterans of Foreign Wars National Home		3573 South Waverly Road	Onondaga Township	February 15, 1990
Ulysses D. Ward House		301 North Butler Boulevard	Lansing	December 19, 1984
White Oak Township Hall		1002 South Stockbridge Road (M-52)	Millville	June 6, 1977
Alvin Whitehead-James Seager House		533 South Grand Avenue	Lansing	July 21, 1988
Williamston Center United Methodist Church		SW corner of Zimmer and Haslett roads	Williamston Center	May 20, 1982
Wolverine Boys' State Inc., Wolverine Girls' State - American Legion Auxiliary Informational Designation		212 North Verlinden Avenue	Lansing	August 23, 1990
Women's Club Association Building		605 South Washington Avenue	Lansing	December 18, 1974
Woodberry-Kerns House		606 Townsend Street	Lansing	January 18, 1980
Chester D. Woodbury House		415 M.A.C. Avenue	East Lansing	April 24, 1981

== See also ==
- National Register of Historic Places listings in Ingham County, Michigan

== Sources ==
- Historic Sites Online – Ingham County. Michigan State Housing Developmental Authority. Accessed February 5, 2011.
