= Campus of Michigan State University =

College campus in East Lansing, Michigan, US

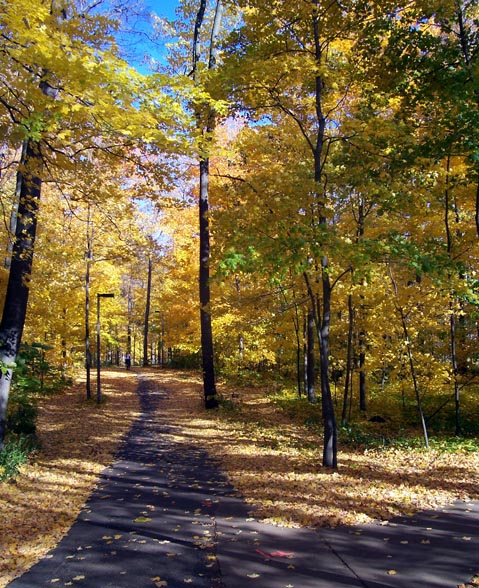
MSU's campus contains many heavily forested areas. This trail runs behind several residence halls, including Owen Hall, McDonel Hall, and Holmes Hall.

The campus of Michigan State University is located in East Lansing on the banks of the Red Cedar River, and comprises a contiguous area of 5,200 acres (21 km^{2}), 2,000 acres (8.1 km^{2}) of which are developed. Built amid virgin forest, the campus opened in 1855 with three buildings, none of which remain. As an agricultural college, the campus was originally located several miles outside of the city of Lansing, but as the population of the college grew, the city of East Lansing developed just north of the area's main avenue.

Michigan State is one of the largest campuses in the United States. As the campus of a large university, MSU has many facilities that serve not only the school, but the entire metropolitan area. Public venues on campus include a football stadium, multipurpose arena, ice arena, concert hall, hotel, and golf course. The campus also has its own power plant, laundry service, incinerator, and Amtrak train station.

In terms of infrastructure, there are 556 buildings: 100 for academics, 131 for agriculture, 166 for housing and food service, and 42 for athletics. Overall, the university has 22,763,025 square feet (2,114,754.2 m^{2}) of total indoor space. MSU also owns 44 non-campus properties, totaling 52,000 acres (210 km^{2}) in 28 different counties. However, the size of the campus, combined with its curving roads and lack of a centralized quadrangle, can make it difficult for newcomers to navigate.

== History ==
Before the white settlement of the region, the area that is now East Lansing was a combination of dense virgin oak forest and tamarack swampland. In July 1855 a 677-acre site just north of the Red Cedar River was recommended to the State Board of Education, the report to the board noted that except for the occasional clearing the land was dense hardwood forest. It was in one of these "oak openings" that the school built its first three buildings in 1856: a multipurpose building called College Hall, a dormitory building later known as "Saints' Rest", and a barn. College Hall contained classrooms, offices, laboratories, a library/museum, and a multifunctional lecture hall/chapel. It was also one of the first buildings in America to be used for the teaching of scientific agriculture.

Michigan Agricultural College campus on opening day May 13, 1857

Since the college was founded in a sparsely populated area with only a handful of nearby farmhouses, and it was an arduous stagecoach ride from Lansing, the College built four faculty houses in the first year of classes in 1857. One of these original faculty houses, Cowles House, still exists as the President's official residence, though only two walls and part of the foundation remain of the original construction. Ultimately, ten faculty homes were built on campus between 1857 and 1885. Besides Cowles House, one other survived and was moved into the city of East Lansing; the rest were demolished between 1922 and 1948 to make room for the north complex of residence halls and the student center called MSU Union.

Michigan State's campus was among the first to serve as a botanical laboratory for its faculty and students and is the site of what is, today, the oldest continuously operated botanical garden in the US. In December 1879, Professor William J. Beal buried seeds of 23 common plants in 20 jars of sand (to prevent water accumulation) in various locations around campus. At certain fixed intervals, currently every 20 years, a jar is dug up to determine which seeds still germinate after their prolonged periods of unlit isolation. The jar dug up in April 2000, after 120 years, found only a few specimens surviving to germinate, notably Verbascum blattaria (moth mullein). The most recently unearthed jar, dug up in April 2021, yielded similar results: 13 Verbascum blattaria seeds were the only ones to germinate. Four jars remain, with the next scheduled to be dug up in 2040.

In 1871, President Abbot proposed that the Board of Trustees "take steps to provide for the proper layout of the college grounds, planting of trees, location of buildings, etc., by a competent landscape gardener, as soon as means can be spared." In 1872, Adam Oliver, a landscape gardener from Kalamazoo, was hired. During his tenure from 1872 to 1887, he was oversaw the layout of walks and drives and the placement of numerous buildings, including Linton Hall in 1881. He was responsible for the closed roadway system, an altered form of which remains today as West Circle Drive, and was also responsible for the informal arrangement of campus buildings. The character of the campus is described in President Abbott's 1882 report to the Board as follows: "There are in the park no straight rows of buildings or of trees, but its...buildings...are separated by undulating lawns, shallow ravines, and groups of trees".

In 1906, O. C. Simonds a well-known prairie school landscape architect was hired, he simplified the road system, planned walks and planting areas. It was Sidmons who first described this area around West Circle Drive as a "sacred space" and who reaffirmed the idea of as area of campus as a park to be protected from development. In a 1906 letter to the Board for Trustee's "This area is, I am sure, that feature of the College which is most pleasantly and affectionately remembered by the students after they leave their Alma Mater, and I doubt if any instruction given has a greater effect upon their lives."

In 1914, the college hired noted landscape architect Frederick Law Olmsted Jr. with bigger buildings like Olds and Agriculture Halls being built Olmsted faced the challenge of maintaining the informal character of campus while minimizing walking distance. In 1915, the Olmsted Brothers firm issued a report its solution was a dramatic redesign of campus around quadrangles. However, the plan was unpopular with students and alumni who wished to maintain the informal parklike feel of campus. After eight years of consulting and little in way of changes the school ended its relationship with Olmsted in 1922.

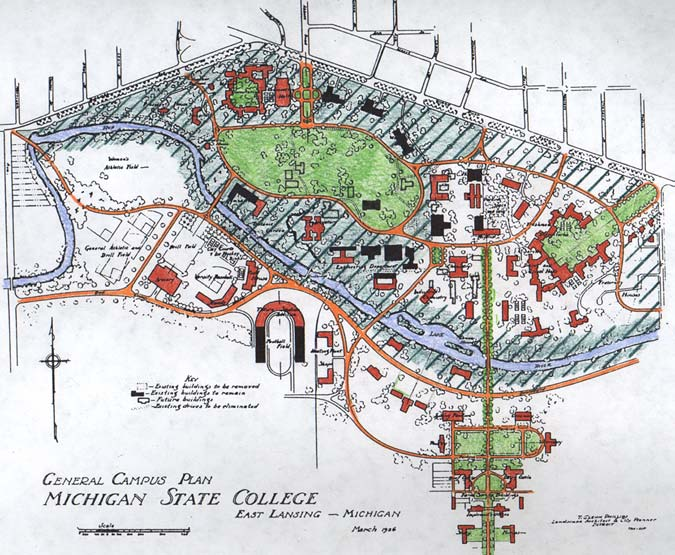
T. Glenn Phillips' 1926 campus plan

The college in 1923 hired T. Glenn Phillips, Phillips' 1926 plan for campus kept Simonds' "sacred space" and it continued the curvilinear road system to the east, with buildings placed in an informal manner. His plan called for campus north of the river to be dedicated to academic purposes while all agriculture and athletic facilities were to be placed south of the river. Phillips' plan would set the tone for campus development for the next 25 years.

Post WWII the large number of GIs returning, President John A. Hannah's push to expand resulting in a large increase in enrollment quickened in the pace of development south of the river. The driving factor in campus development of was the automobile this the south featuring buildings and streets generally laid out in a grid system with more land dedicated to parking lots. This growth resulted in the largest residence hall system in the United States. 16,000 students live in MSU's 23 undergraduate halls, one graduate hall, and three apartment villages. Though MSU has not built a new resident hall since 1967, it has modernized several of its dormitories. In 2007, MSU opened the Residential College in Arts & Humanities in a newly renovated Snyder-Phillips Hall, the location of MSU's first residential college, Justin Morrill College.

In 2001, a new master plan called 2020 Vision: A Community Concept for the MSU Campus was developed to guide future campus development. Amongst the recommendations it called for the removing of central campus parking to parking garages replacing it with green space, the removal of head-in parking around West and East Circle Drives, adding more bike lanes and planting more trees on south campus in order to give it the look and feel of north campus.

== Areas ==
=== North campus ===
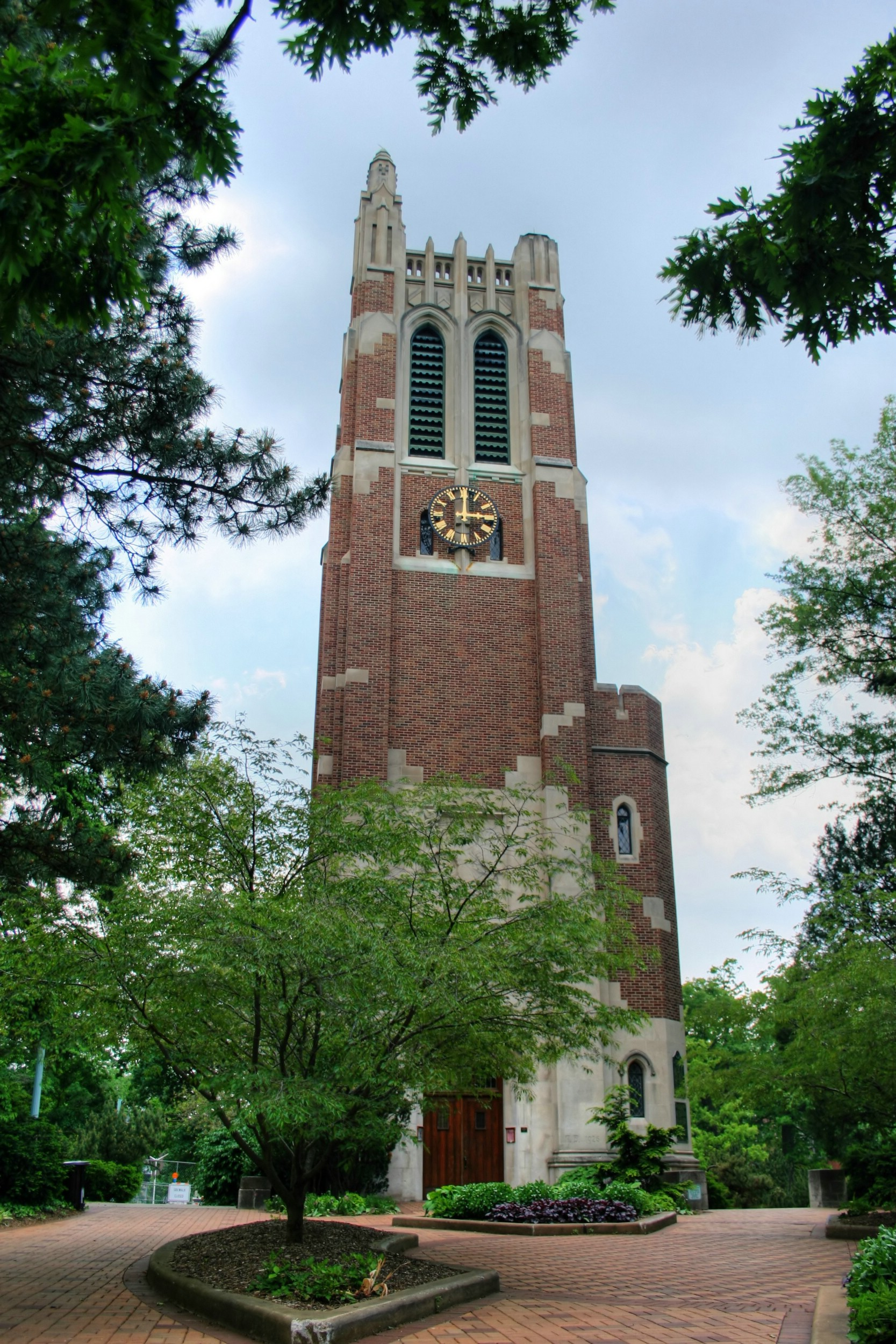
Beaumont Tower marks the site of the old College Hall, and is surrounded on all sides by West Circle Drive.

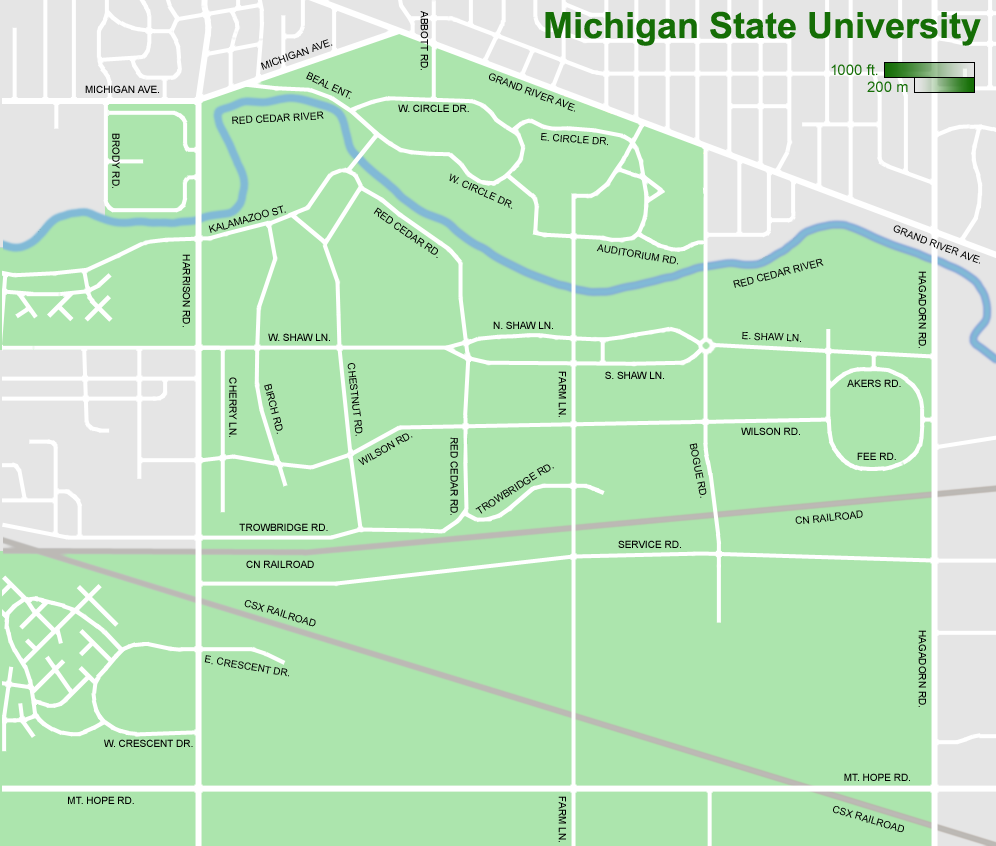
A simplified map of campus.

The oldest part of campus is north of the Red Cedar River and south of Grand River Avenue and Michigan Avenue. Its buildings are an eclectic collection of architectural styles including Collegiate Gothic, Beaux Arts, and Richardsonian Romanesque. The north campus has plentiful trees and curving roads with few straight lines. In the center of the north campus lies the "Sacred Space", which is surrounded on all sides by West Circle Drive. It was in this area that the College erected its first three buildings. None of these three buildings are still standing, but there are still some important historical buildings on and near the Sacred Space. These include Cowles House, the President's official residence, and Beaumont Tower, a carillon clock tower marking the site of College Hall. To the east of the Sacred Space lies Laboratory Row, a group of laboratory buildings constructed during the late 19th and early 20th centuries. These include Eustace-Cole Hall and Marshall-Adams Hall, America's first freestanding laboratories for horticulture and bacteriology, respectively.

=== South campus ===
The campus south of the Red Cedar River consists mostly of buildings built after World War II. Many of them are built in the International and Brutalist styles, with relatively straight roadways and fewer trees than the north campus. South campus also has more surface parking lots, due partly to the sporting and performing arts venues. The "2020 Vision" Master Plan proposes replacing these parking lots with parking ramps and green space, in order to replicate the park like feel of North Campus but these plans will take many years to reach fruition. Notable academic and research buildings on the South Campus include the Cyclotron and the College of Law.

=== Service campus and beyond ===
The majority of Michigan State's academic and residential buildings are north of the Canadian National Railway. South of the CN line are service buildings such as the T. B. Simon Power Plant, laundry services, and the campus incinerator. Nevertheless, there are a growing number of academic buildings south of the railroad. The MSU Clinical Center and the Life Sciences Building are both in this part of campus, as is a nature preserve known as the Baker Woodlot. South still of the university service buildings and the CSX railroad lie thousands of acres of university-owned farmland and agricultural research related facilities such the MSU Pavilion. The proximity of the farmland to campus helps MSU retain a rural feel in keeping with its roots as an agricultural college that mixes with the more urban atmosphere of East Lansing just a mile north. Recently, The Demmer Center has been added to Michigan State University's campus. The Demmer Center is an educational place for students, faculty, and community members to learn to safely handle firearms.

== Landmarks ==
Michigan State is home to three bronze statues, two of which were erected in 2005 and one in 2003. On the entrance plaza of the Administration Building that bears his name is the statue of former president John A. Hannah. Downstream on the south bank of the Red Cedar River is the new bronze statue of "The Spartan". This 2005 replica replaced the original terra cotta statue, which can still be seen in the west concourse of Spartan Stadium. The third statue, erected in 2003, is a 12-foot likeness of famed Spartan Basketball star and Los Angeles Laker, Earvin "Magic" Johnson.

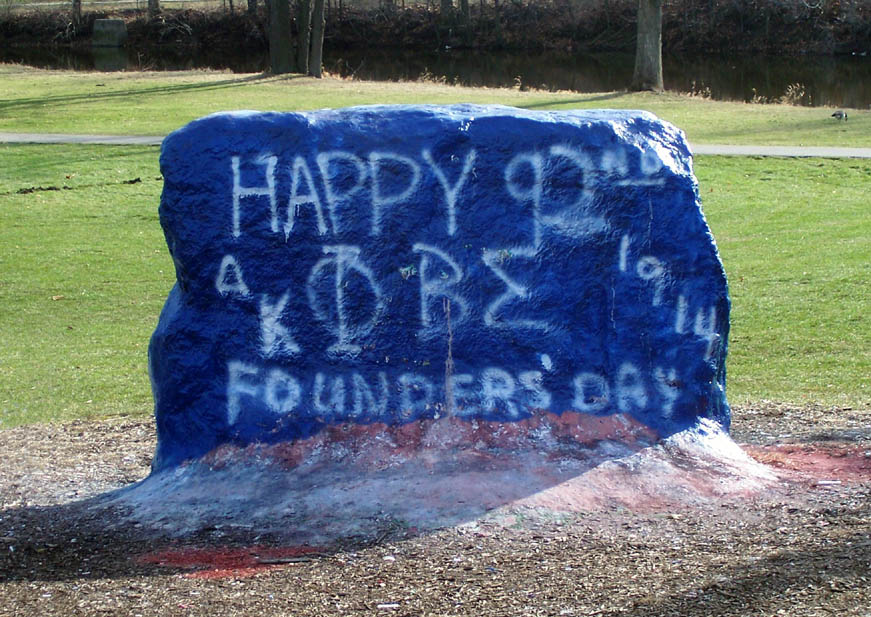
"The Rock" on January 12, 2006.

Another landmark is the spray painted boulder known as "The Rock". Lying east of Farm Lane just north of the river, it is a popular spot for campus events such as outdoor summer theatre, Greek house tailgating, and candlelight vigils. It was once used by Michigan Agricultural College (forerunner to MSU) students to study mineral contents. MSU has several botanical gardens, including the W. J. Beal Botanical Garden just across the river from the stadium, the Old Horticulture Gardens next to the building of the same name, the MSU Horticulture Gardens, the Radiology Healing Gardens, and the adjoining 4-H Children's Garden.

The university has several buildings for public gatherings and events. Spartan Stadium serves as the university's football stadium. The Breslin Center is a multi-purpose basketball arena. The Munn Ice Arena is used for ice hockey. The MSU Pavilion serves as a venue for agricultural expositions and other types of events. Abrams Planetarium sits between North Shaw Lane and South Shaw Lane. Michigan State has two separate buildings for theatre. The MSU Auditorium/Fairchild Theatre is used for the MSU Theatre Department's shows, concerts, and public speakers. The Auditorium is on Farm Lane and the north bank of the river, in the heart of campus. To the southeast lies the main theatre for the Lansing metropolitan area, the Wharton Center for Performing Arts. The Wharton Center features Broadway plays and other performances, and was the site of the 1992 U.S. presidential election debates. The university also has its own hotel/convention center, the Kellogg Center.

== Transportation ==
MSU's campus has a network of sidewalks, bike paths, roads (often with bike lanes), and unpaved trails. Its transportation network consists of 27 miles (43 km) of roads and 100 miles (160 km) of sidewalks. Common, non-motor vehicle methods of campus navigation used are: Walking, bicycling, rollerblading and skateboarding. Motorscooters and mopeds are also not uncommon. A few skywalks and public tunnels link some buildings on campus. The non-motorized Lansing River Trail's eastern trailhead is located on campus, extending west to downtown Lansing and then north towards the airport. The non-motorized River Corridor runs across campus along the south side of the Red Cedar River, and is the primary east-west route for non-motorized traffic on campus.

The main roads that go through MSU's campus are West Circle Drive, East Circle Drive, Shaw Lane, Farm Lane, Wilson Road, Bogue Road, and Red Cedar Road. Passing through crowded areas of campus, these roads receive high volumes of pedestrian and vehicle traffic. Another popular mode of transportation is the Capital Area Transportation Authority bus service, which has many routes across campus in addition to regular service outside campus in the Lansing, East Lansing, and Okemos areas. Many routes through campus are designated as "Spartan Service", meaning they only operate during MSU fall and spring semesters. The MSU-CTC (MSU CATA Transportation Center) is the hub of bus service on campus, and many local destinations both on- and off-campus may be reached from there. Buses are used especially frequently during the winter.

With two railroads crossing campus, MSU students have easy access to rail travel. The East Lansing Amtrak station is located on campus, offering daily direct service to and from Chicago, Kalamazoo, Flint, Port Huron, and several other cities throughout Michigan via the Blue Water line. Cities such as Detroit, Ann Arbor and Grand Rapids can be reached by transferring onto a different line. The station is also serviced by several Greyhound bus routes. Two airports are accessible from campus: Lansing Capital Region International Airport (LAN) in DeWitt Township and the Detroit Metro Airport (DTW) outside Detroit. Bus service to and from DTW is offered eight times daily by Michigan Flyer.
