= Michigan State University Honors College =

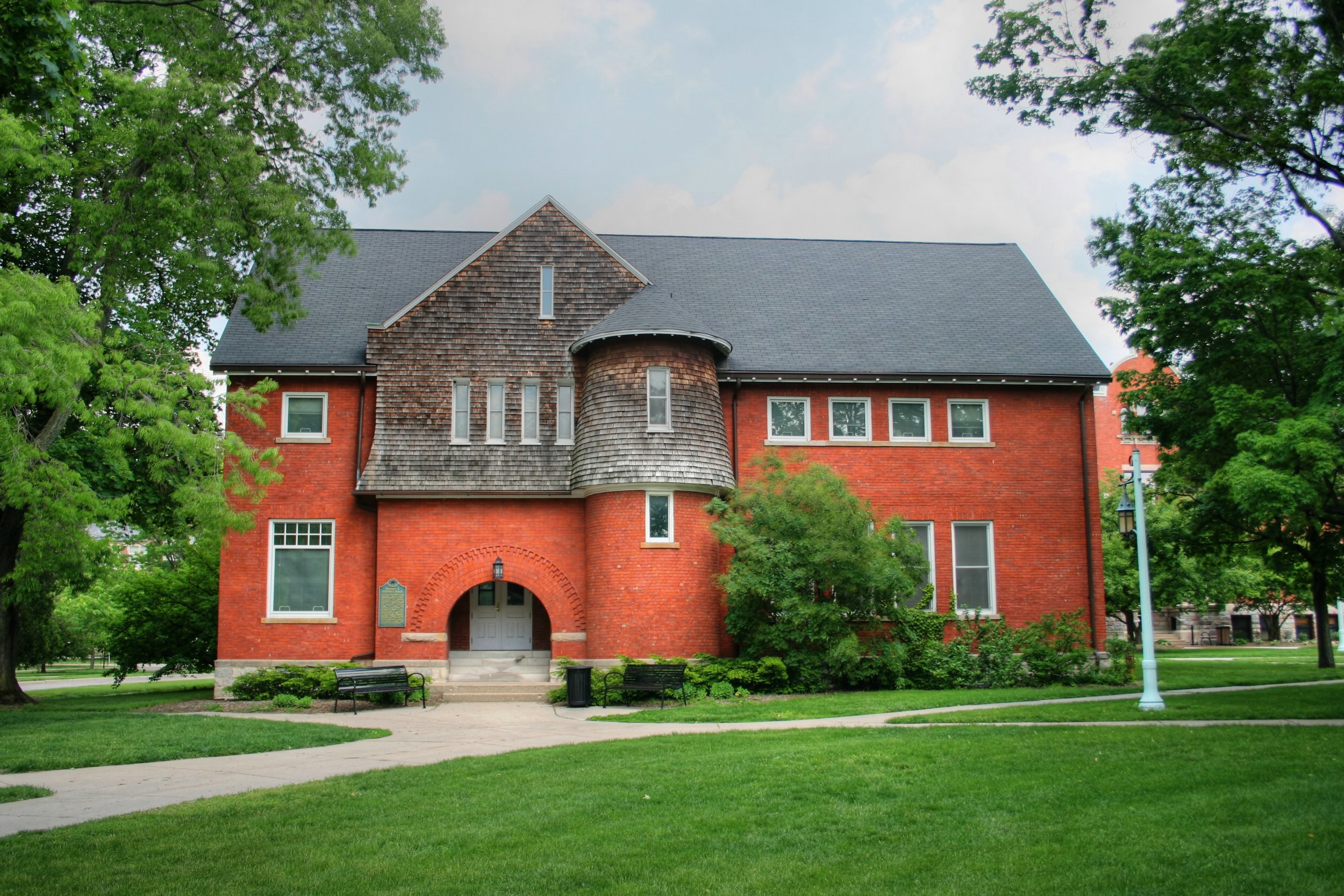
Eustace-Cole Hall

The Michigan State University Honors College was established in 1956 to provide more academic opportunities for distinguished students of Michigan State University in East Lansing, Michigan and to emphasize academic challenge and achievement. It is currently housed in Eustace-Cole Hall on the northern portion of MSU's campus.

High school students starting at MSU may join the Honors College if they are in the top 5% of their high school graduating class and have either an ACT score of at least 30 or an SAT total score of at least 1360. Once admitted, students must maintain a 3.20 GPA and complete eight approved honors courses in order to graduate with Honors College designation on their degree.

Honors College students may choose to reside on selected honors floors in campus housing. Current honors floors are in Yakeley-Gilchrist, Case, Wilson, Holmes, Bryan, Snyder-Phillips, and Mason residence halls. In addition, a new Honors College dormitory, Campbell Hall, is to open in Fall 2025 to serve as a living-learning community reserved only for Honors students.
