= Eustace Hall =

- U.S. National Register of Historic Places
- Michigan State Historic Site
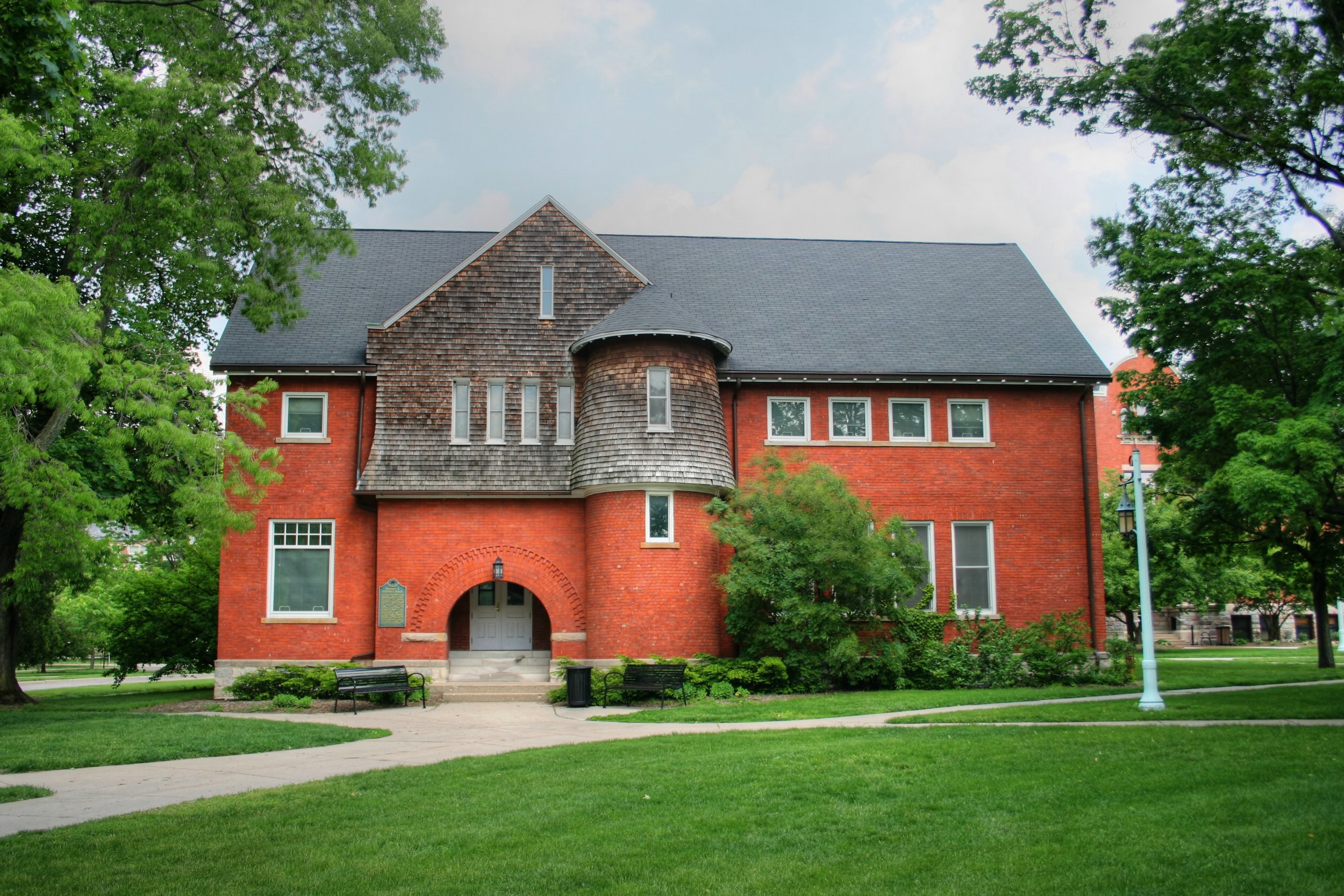

- Location within Michigan Location within the United States
- Interactive map
- Location: East Circle Drive, Michigan State University campus, East Lansing, Michigan
- Coordinates: 42°41′56″N 84°26′51″W
- Area: 1 acre (0.40 ha)
- Built: 1888
- Architect: attributed to Liberty Hyde Bailey by NRHP and to William D. Appleyard by MSU
- NRHP reference No.: 71000395
- Added to NRHP: September 3, 1971

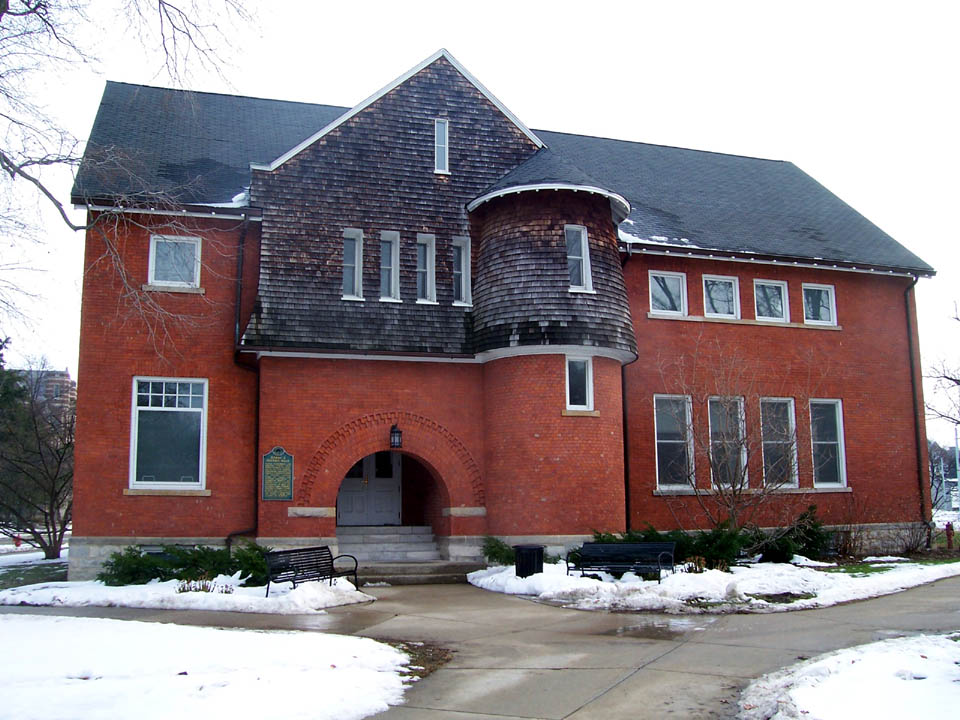
Eustace Hall in the winter

Formerly known as Eustace Hall, Eustace-Cole Hall located on Laboratory Row is the only building on Michigan State University's main campus in East Lansing, Michigan that is on the National Register of Historic Places. Designed in a mix of "Queen Anne massing, Richardsonian Romanesque features, and Shingle Style", it was built in 1888 as the Horticultural Laboratory Building. Its design has been variously attributed to noted MSU alumnus and noted horticulturist Liberty Hyde Bailey and to Lansing architect William Appleyard It housed the horticulture department until 1924 when a new horticulture building (now known as Old Horticulture) was opened. It then became the University College Building until 1961 when it was renamed for Harry J. Eustace who chaired the Horticulture Department from 1908 to 1918.

The third-oldest extant building on the MSU campus, it was listed on the Michigan Register of Historic Places on March 3, 1971 as the Horticultural Laboratory Building and was listed on the National Register on September 3, 1971 as Eustace Hall.

In 1999, Eustace Hall underwent a $3 million renovation funded in part by a major donation from MSU alumni Jeffrey N. Cole (BS, 1970) and Kathryn C. Cole (MBA, 1990) of Birmingham, Michigan and was renamed Eustace-Cole Hall in their honor. Eustace-Cole Hall now serves as the headquarters of the MSU Honors College.

== See also ==
- National Register of Historic Places listings in Ingham County, Michigan
- List of Michigan State Historic Sites in Ingham County, Michigan
