= Walter Adams (economist) =

American economist and college professor

- Walter Adams, official press release photo as president, April 1969.
- Born: August 27, 1922; Vienna, Austria
- Died: September 8, 1998 (aged 76); East Lansing, Michigan, U.S.
- Occupations: Economist and college professor

Walter Adams (August 27, 1922 – September 8, 1998) was an Austrian-born American economist and college professor. He served as the 13th President of Michigan State University and served as an expert witness before 36 congressional committees.

== Early life ==
Walter Adams was born in Vienna, Austria, in 1922. His father, Edward Adams, was an international linen and diamond merchant; his mother, Ilona Schildkraut, was a homemaker. The family moved to Brooklyn, New York, in 1935, where he attended New Utrecht High School. He earned a BA in economics from Brooklyn College in 1942, graduating magna cum laude, before joining the U.S. Army in April 1943.

Adams served with distinction in the 83rd Infantry and 11th Armored Divisions, landing at Normandy in the days following D-Day, "participating in the Battle of the Bulge, and helping to liberate three concentration camps." He earned a battlefield commission as second lieutenant (later attaining the rank of first lieutenant), and in 1945 was awarded the Bronze Star for heroic conduct.

After World War II ended, Adams returned to his wife, Pauline Gordon (they had wed on August 23, 1943), and his studies and completed his MA and Ph.D degrees at Yale University in 1946 and 1947. The couple's only child, William James Adams, was born in 1947.

== Professor of economics ==
Walter Adams joined the faculty of Michigan State College (now Michigan State University) in 1947. He became a professor in 1956, and was honored with the title Distinguished Professor just four years later.

Throughout his career, Adams wrote many books and papers, including The Bigness Complex: Industry, Labor, and Government in the American Economy; The Tobacco Wars; and Adam Smith Goes to Moscow. He frequently traveled to Washington, D.C., where he served as an expert witness at Congressional budget hearings.

For many years at Michigan State, Adams taught a senior-level class (known in the course catalog as Economics 444) on American enterprise and public policy. It was widely reputed to be one of the most difficult yet rewarding courses available at MSU. One veteran of the class wrote, "Students who signed up for Econ 444 knew that they were going for the educational adventure of their lives."

== President of MSU ==
Following the resignation of John A. Hannah in 1969, Adams was asked by the board of trustees to serve as interim president while a selection process could be undertaken. Adams accepted, and was sworn in as Michigan State's 13th President on April 1, 1969.

His brief, nine-month term was marked by the same campus unrest and student protests that were occurring across the United States in 1969. Adams was, however, frequently able to defuse tense situations using a combination of self-effacing humor and a willingness to engage the students personally in open dialogue.

In spite of his limited administrative experience, Walter Adams carried Michigan State University through a very difficult period in student/establishment relations. The students' positive impression of him may be seen in the numerous pro-Adams editorials that were published in the student paper, The State News. His success can be measured by the fact that toward the end of his term, petitions requesting that he remain as president had collected the signatures of some 950 faculty and 20,000 students—approximately half of the entire student body. However, he stuck to his original promise, and on January 1, 1970, Walter Adams returned to what he considered his true calling, economics.

In 1971, Adams published a memoir of his experiences as president, titled The Test.

== Legacy ==
During his career, Walter Adams wrote more than a dozen economics books and untold numbers of scholarly papers. He retired from MSU in 1992 and became the Vernon F. Taylor Distinguished Professor of Economics at Trinity University that same year, a position he held until his death. Trinity's Department of Economics established the Walter Adams Prize for Excellence in Economics in his honor, "to recognize a graduating economics major at Trinity who has achieved great distinction in scholarship and involvement in the life of the University community."

Beyond his scholarly prowess, Walter Adams is remembered at Michigan State as being the "ultimate Spartan fan." He held season tickets to seats directly behind the visiting team's bench in Jenison Fieldhouse, where basketball games were played through the 1988–89 season. (Today, an NCAA rule prohibits this.) "Ears were assailed by his piercing voice as he stridently ragged the opposing coach and offered advice to our own coaches on how to defeat the enemy." Coach Bobby Knight, then of Indiana, who often received the brunt of Adams's vitriol, began a pre-game gift exchange with Adams as an attempt at appeasement (to little avail).

Walter Adams donated instruments to the Spartan Marching Band and was made an "honorary band member," a rare honor. Each fall he would put on his band jacket and a green Tyrolean hat with green-and-white plume, place one of his trademark cigars between his teeth, and lead the band in its march to the stadium. He was known as the "Number One Band Fan." Today a scholarship for a marching band member demonstrating academic excellence is endowed in Adams' name.

Walter Adams died at home of pancreatic cancer on September 8, 1998. Soon after his death, the former army cadet drill field west of the Music Building, from which the Spartan Marching Band steps off to march to the stadium on football Saturdays, was renamed from Landon Field (after the nearby residence hall) to Walter Adams Field. A commemorative garden, plaque and park bench, nestled at the edge of the field midway between Cowles House and the Music Building, were later added.

In 2002 a former student and protégé of Adams, MSU Trustee Randall L. Pittman, along with his wife Mary, donated US$6 million to restore and update Marshall Hall, a former bacteriology laboratory which has long held offices of the Department of Economics. For their generosity the Pittmans were allowed to append a name to the building, and they chose to honor Walter Adams. The building is now known as Marshall–Adams Hall.

== Notes ==
Academic offices
Preceded by John A. Hannah	President of Michigan State University; April 1, 1969 – January 1, 1970	Succeeded by Clifton R. Wharton, Jr.
