= Satish Udpa =

American electrical engineer

Satish S. Udpa
- Occupations: Electrical engineer, inventor, academic, and author

Academic background
- Education: B. Tech., Electrical Engineering; Postgraduate Diploma, Electrical Engineering; M.S., Electrical Engineering; Ph.D., Electrical Engineering
- Alma mater: Jawaharlal Nehru Technological University; Colorado State University

Academic work
- Institutions: Michigan State University (MSU); Iowa State University (ISU); Colorado State University (CSU)

Satish S. Udpa is an American electrical engineer, inventor, academic, and author. He is the President Emeritus and University Distinguished Professor Emeritus at Michigan State University (MSU).

Udpa's research focuses on materials characterization, NDE applications, and clinical tools, emphasizing the development of sensors and models for optimized inspection and defect detection. His academic and professional contributions include patents, authorship of books and chapters, and published articles. He received the Robert F. Banks Award for Institutional Leadership and was listed by Marquis Who's Who Top Educators for his work in academia.

Udpa has been named a Fellow of Institute of Electrical and Electronics Engineers (IEEE), the American Society for Nondestructive Testing (ASNT), the Indian Society for Nondestructive Testing, and the Engineering Society of Detroit. He is also a member of the U.S. National Academy of Inventors and serves on the Board of Directors of the American Society for Nondestructive Testing. He served as the Technical Editor for the Electromagnetic Nondestructive Testing Handbook, Editor of IEEE Transactions on Magnetics, and Regional Editor of the International Journal of Applied Electromagnetics and Mechanics.

== Education and early career ==
Udpa earned his B.Tech. and Postgraduate Diploma in Electrical Engineering from Jawaharlal Nehru Technological University, which he completed in 1975 and 1977, respectively. He worked at Electronics Corporation of India until 1978. He earned an M.S. in Electrical Engineering in 1980 and a Ph.D. in Electrical Engineering in 1983 from Colorado State University.

== Career ==
Udpa continued his academic career at Colorado State University in 1983 as a Research Assistant Professor for a year, became an Assistant Professor from 1984 to 1988, and served as an Associate Professor from 1988 to 1990. Following this, he joined Iowa State University, where he served as an associate professor until 1992, became a professor in 1992, held the position until 2001. Subsequently, he served as Associate Chairman for Research and Graduate Studies from 1997 to 2002 and was designated Whitney Professor of Electrical and Computer Engineering in 2000, a position he held until 2001.

Udpa joined MSU as a Professor and Chairperson of the Department of Electrical and Computer Engineering from 2001 to 2005. He then took on the Acting Dean role for a year before assuming the position of Dean, which he held until 2013. After his deanship, he served as Executive Vice President for Administration from 2013 to 2019 and President from 2014 to 2019. Since 2009, he has held the title of University Distinguished Professor and President Emeritus at MSU.

== Research ==
Udpa's research interests have included the area of nondestructive evaluation and testing. They involved the development of numerical forward models that mimic processes underlying several nondestructive testing methods. He has developed methods for rendering magnetic flux leakage (MFL) signals invariant to permeability and sensor velocity variations. His work also involved the use of several signal processing techniques to improve the signal-to-noise ratio of NDE signals including the application of wavelet basis function neural networks for gas pipeline inspection, an adaptive filter and wavelet-based de-noising technique for detecting MFL signals from seamless pipes, radial basis function neural networks and adaptive wavelets to predict defect depth profiles in pipe walls. He also developed an iterative inversion scheme that aided in the prediction of pipeline life.

Udpa holds patents for several contributions, including a 1995 development of an apparatus for driving an ultrasonic transducer using lock-in frequency and modulated tone-burst pulses. He also designed a rotating field transceiver probe for eddy current detection, enabling precise defect location. Moreover, he co-holds a patent for an apparatus designed to guide cylindrical articles for surface flaw detection and created a probe to detect surface and subsurface defects using a rotating magnetic field and an array of sensors.

== Awards and honors ==
- 1999 – Warren Boast Outstanding Teaching Award, Iowa State University
- 2010 – Robert F. Banks Award for Institutional Leadership, Michigan State University
- 2013 – Fellow, U.S. National Academy of Inventors
- 2024 – Top Educators, Marquis Who's Who

== Bibliography ==
=== Books ===
- Advanced Microwave and Millimeter-wave Detectors (1994) ISBN 9780819415998
- Electromagnetic Nondestructive Evaluation (IV) (2000) ISBN 9781586030230
- Electromagnetic Nondestructive Evaluation (V) (2001) ISBN 9781586031558
- Electromagnetic Nondestructive Evaluation (VI) (2002) ISBN 9781586032456

=== Selected articles ===
- Udpa, L., & Udpa, S. S. (1991, February). Neural networks for the classification of nondestructive evaluation signals. In IEE Proceedings F (Radar and Signal Processing) (Vol. 138, No. 1, pp. 41–45). IET Digital Library.
- Al-Yousefi, H., & Udpa, S. S. (1992). Recognition of Arabic characters. IEEE Transactions on Pattern Analysis & Machine Intelligence, 14(08), 853–857.
- Polikar, R., Upda, L., Upda, S. S., & Honavar, V. (2001). Learn++: An incremental learning algorithm for supervised neural networks. IEEE transactions on systems, man, and cybernetics, part C (applications and reviews), 31(4), 497–508.
- Afzal, M., & Udpa, S. (2002). Advanced signal processing of magnetic flux leakage data obtained from seamless gas pipeline. NDT & E International, 35(7), 449–457.
- Ramuhalli, P., Udpa, L., & Udpa, S. S. (2005). Finite-element neural networks for solving differential equations. IEEE transactions on neural networks, 16(6), 1381–1392.
- Joshi, A., Udpa, L., Udpa, S., & Tamburrino, A. (2006). Adaptive wavelets for characterizing magnetic flux leakage signals from pipeline inspection. IEEE transactions on magnetics, 42(10), 3168–3170.
- Yang, G., Tamburrino, A., Udpa, L., Udpa, S. S., Zeng, Z., Deng, Y., & Que, P. (2009). Pulsed eddy-current-based giant magnetoresistive system for the inspection of aircraft structures. IEEE transactions on magnetics, 46(3), 910–917.
