= John Rayner House =

- U.S. National Register of Historic Places
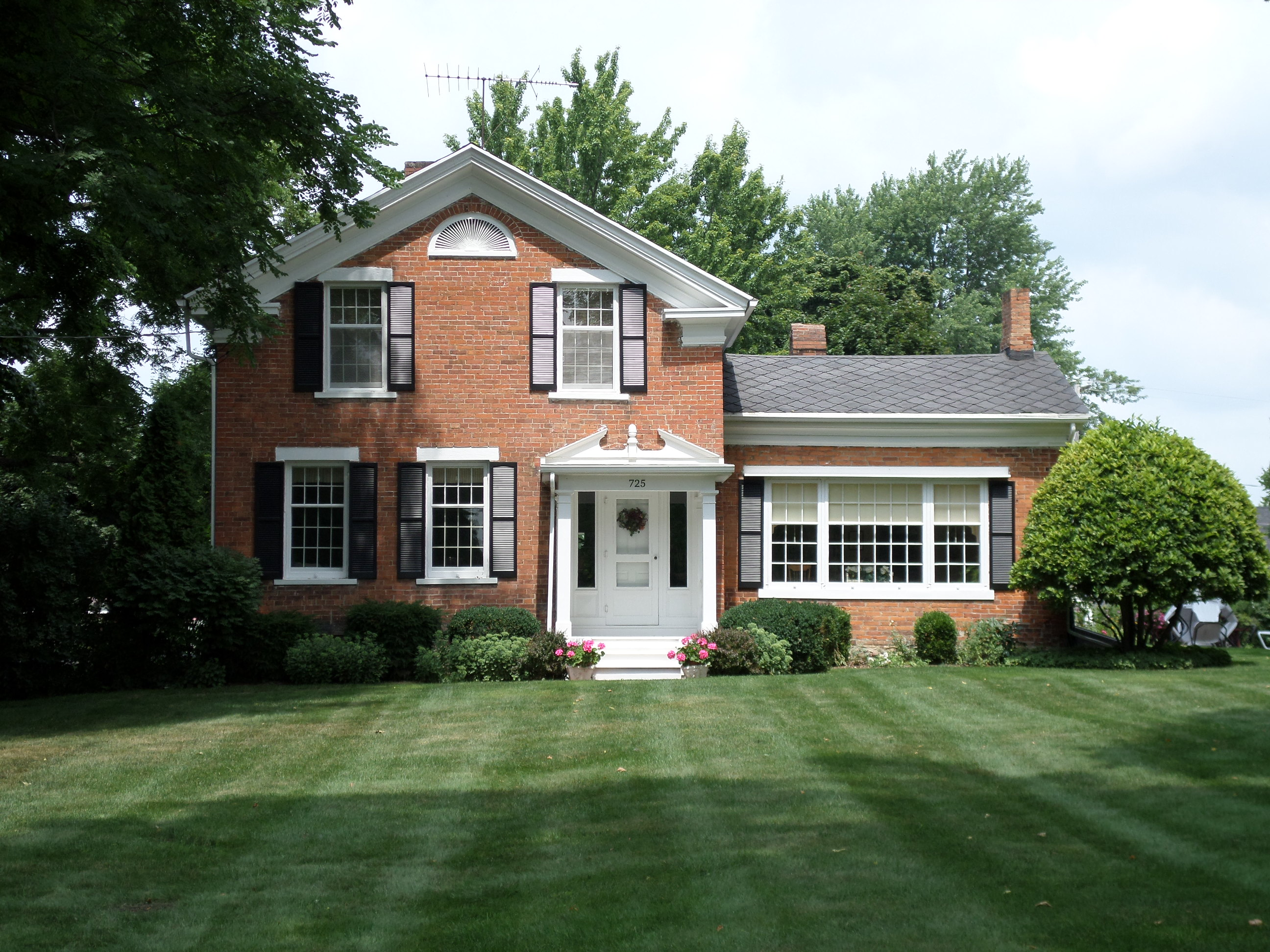
- Interactive map
- Location: 725 E. Ash St., Mason, Michigan
- Coordinates: 42°34′42″N 84°25′53″W
- Area: 1.1 acres (0.45 ha)
- Built: c. 1840
- Architectural style: Upright and Wing
- MPS: Mason Michigan Historic MRA
- NRHP reference No.: 85001241
- Added to NRHP: June 6, 1985

The John Rayner House is a single-family house located at 725 East Ash Street in Mason, Michigan. It was listed on the National Register of Historic Places in 1985. It is one of the earliest structures existing in Mason.

== History ==
In 1840, John and Emma Rayner moved from Auburn, New York, to Mason with their three children. Rayner was interested in farming as well as land speculation, and he purchased 320 acres of land at the site of this house, at that time east of Mason. Rayner likely began the construction of this house immediately in 1840. The Rayners lived here for many years before retiring to another home in Mason, located on the corner of Barnes and Oak. John Rayner died in 1879; at the time of his death he owned thousands of acres and was called "one of the most opulent men of the county."

The Rayner's son A. J. Rayner served in the Civil War and attended the State Normal School (now Eastern Michigan University) before continuing his father's career in land speculation. John and Emma Rayner's second son Charles J. Rayner was also involved in real estate. Their daughter Emma Rayner Wheeler Reed, along with her brothers and second husband, constructed the Rayner Opera House in 1880-81 as a memorial to their father.

== Description ==
The Rayner House is a brick Upright and Wing house with a two-story upright and one-story wing, along with a frame ell at the rear containing a kitchen. The main entrance is in the front of the upright and is flanked with sidelights. The house has gently sloping gable roofs with wide frieze boards, gable returns and fanlights in the gable peaks. There are two windows on the upper story of the main wing and two on the first floor. The wing section has a large picture window that was originally a door, and a smaller window. The foundation of the upright has a front section made of small, rounded cobbles laid in courses, exemplifying early nineteenth-century cobblestone construction most commonly seen in central and western New York.
