= Penfil Apartments =

- U.S. National Register of Historic Places
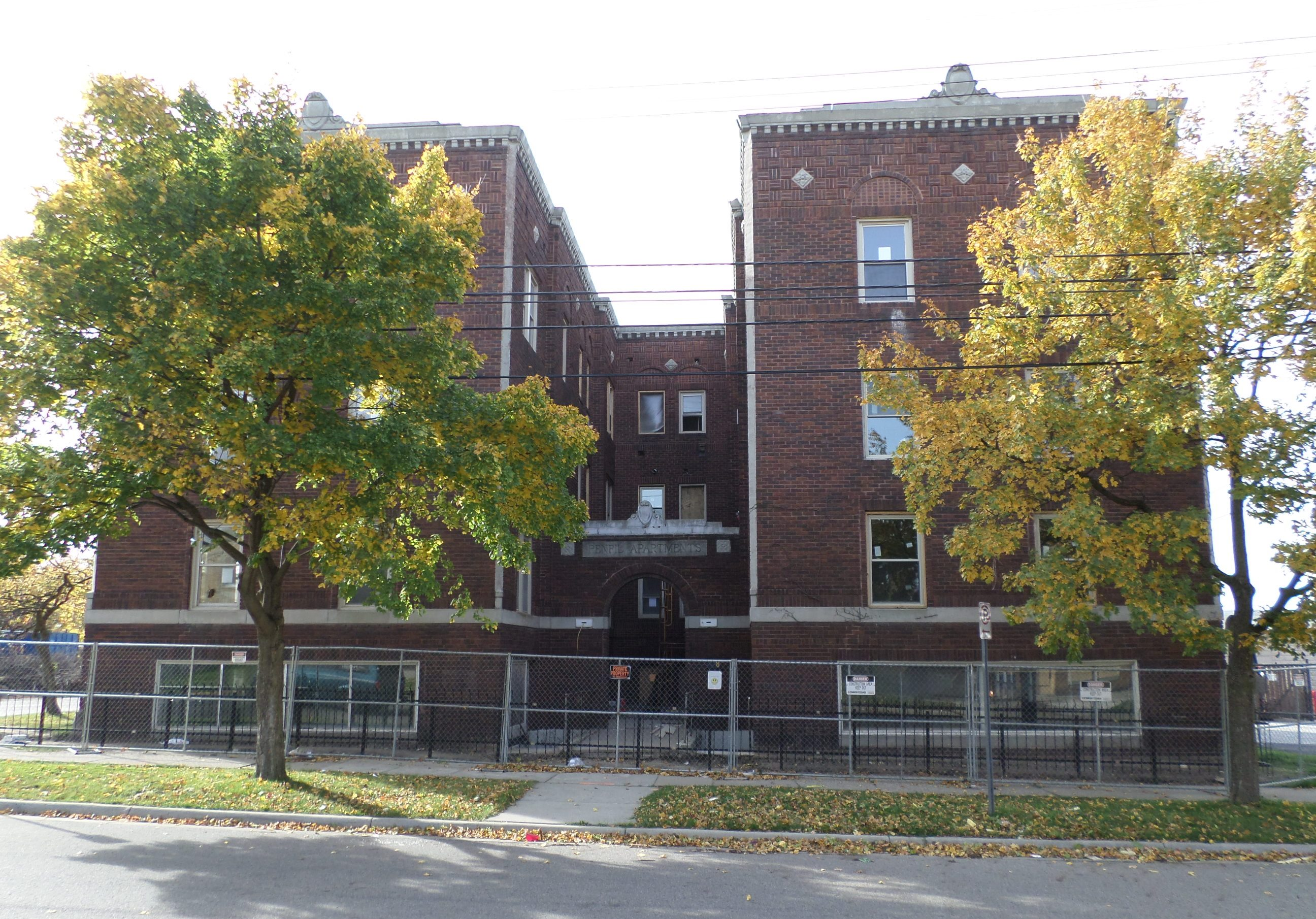
- Penfil Apartments in 2014

- Location within Michigan
- Interactive map
- Location: 108--110 S. Hosmer St., Lansing, Michigan
- Coordinates: 42°43′59″N 84°32′30″W
- Area: less than one acre
- Built: 1923
- Architect: Brezner & Gay
- Architectural style: Italian Renaissance
- NRHP reference No.: 90001654
- Added to NRHP: October 17, 1990

Penfil Apartments is an apartment building located at 108-110 South Hosmer Street in Lansing, Michigan. It was listed on the National Register of Historic Places in 1990. It is one of the few apartment buildings in Lansing constructed prior to World War II.

== History ==
Joseph Penfil was a Lansing businessman who managed a number of small businesses in Lansing in the 1920s and 30s. In 1923, he hired the local architectural firm of Brezner & Gay to design this apartment building. It was constructed in 1923–24 on the site which previously held his house. The Great Depression took a toll on Penfil, and he lost control of the apartment building, which was renamed the Ruel Apartments in 1933.

== Description ==
The Penfil Apartments is a 3 1/2-story red brick Italian Renaissance Revival building with a flat roof, constructed in a symmetrical U-shape with the entrance in the interior courtyard. Large windows are at the lower level, with a water table above. A course of soldier bricks is above the water table, with two more below and above the third floor windows. Basketweave bricks are at the top of the facade.
