= Cowles House (East Lansing, Michigan) =

President's House in Michigan State University, US

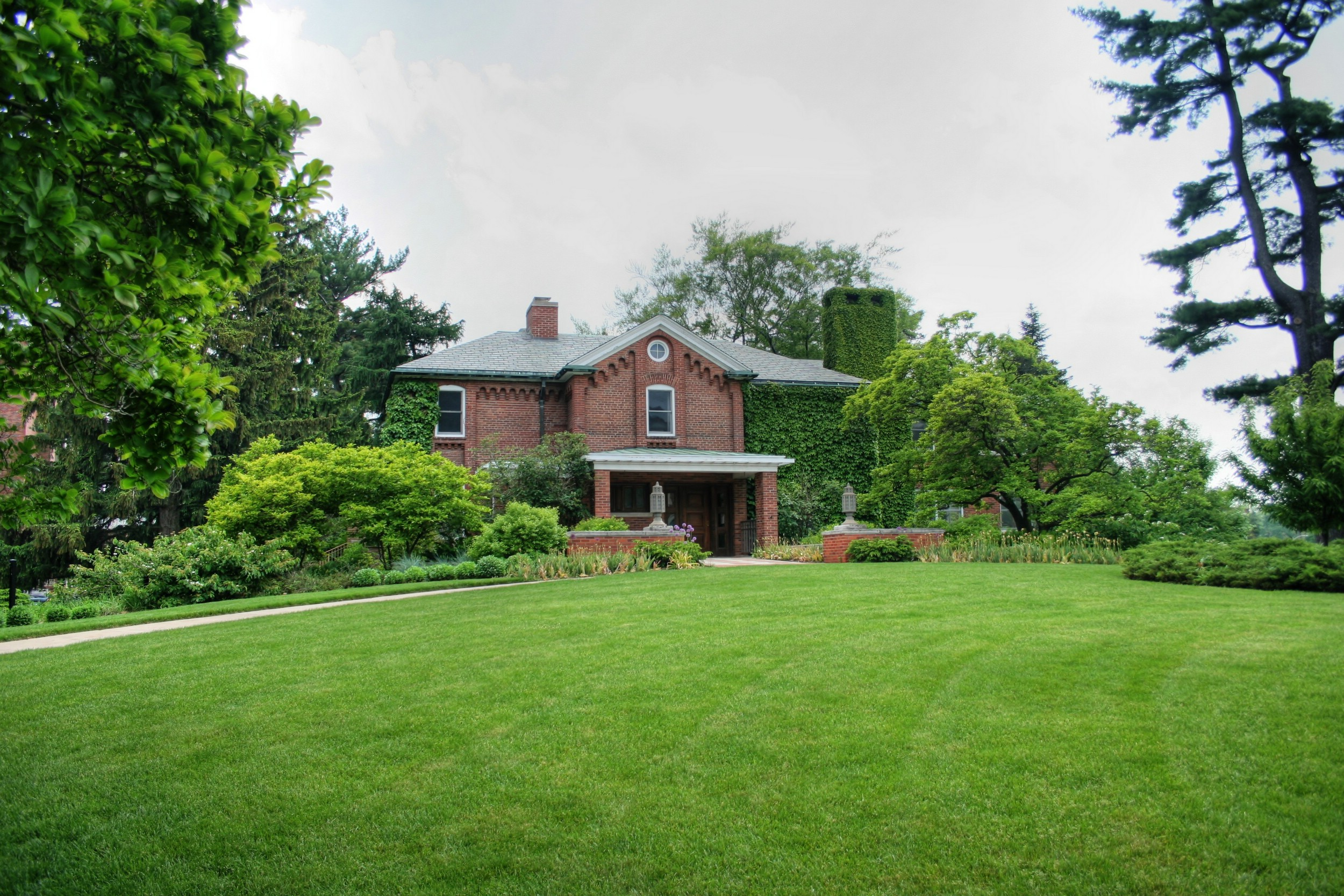
- Interactive map of the Cowles House area
- Former names: Faculty Row No. 7

General information
- Type: President's House
- Architectural style: Eclectic
- Location: Michigan State University, West Circle Drive
- Coordinates: 42.7334°N 84.4845°W
- Named for: Alice B. Cowles
- Completed: 1857, 1950

Design and construction
- Architects: J.J. Scott (1857); Calder (1950)

Alice B. Cowles House (formerly Faculty Row House Number 7) is a structure on the campus of Michigan State University. It is the oldest extant building on MSU's campus, though only the foundation and two exterior walls remain from the original 1857 construction.

Originally built to house faculty before the founding of what is now East Lansing, Number 7's earliest residents were presidents Joseph R. Williams and T. C. Abbot. When a new president's house was built at Faculty Row Number 1 (no longer standing), Number 7 became the residence of the Professor of Botany; William J. Beal and his family lived here for 39 years. As East Lansing grew and professors moved away from Faculty Row, the house served several purposes over the years, including offices for the Education Department and as a women's dormitory.

It has been the official president's residence since 1941, beginning with President John A. Hannah, who had the house extensively remodeled to suit this purpose. A 1950 renovation funded by alumnus Frederick Cowles Jenison resulted in the house being named for Jenison's mother, Alice B. Cowles. (Jenison's grandfather, Albert Cowles, had been a student in the school's first class and had helped haul the bricks during the original construction.)

After Hannah, three presidents have chosen not to live in the house: Walter Adams during his nine months as Acting President in 1969 and 1970, Lou Anna Simon from 2005 to 2018, and Satish Udpa during his eight months as acting president in 2019. All three preferred to remain in their East Lansing homes, and instead used Cowles House primarily for formal entertaining and other official university functions. The house was being renovated during most of Udpa's tenure.
