= Laboratory Row =

Laboratory Row is a collection of buildings at Michigan State University's campus in East Lansing, Michigan. Built in the late 19th and early 20th centuries it comprises the oldest collection of buildings on campus. The site originally was dedicated to the school's first farming facilities, but as the college outgrew its first buildings additional academic space was needed. In all, seven buildings were built, of which six survive today.

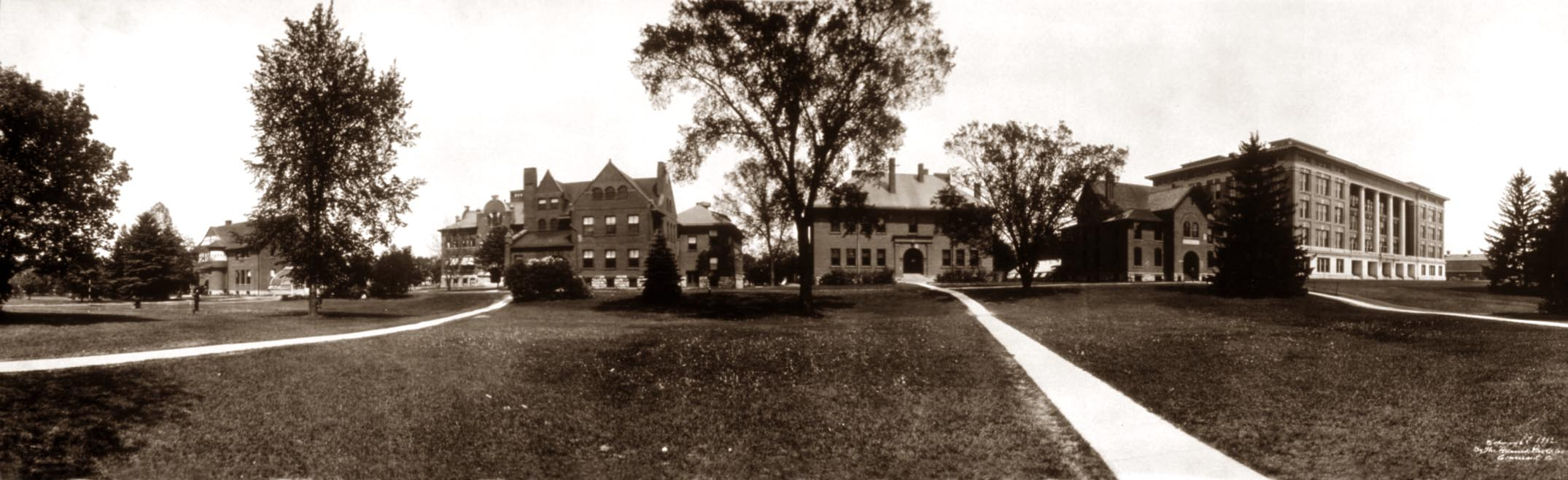
Michigan State University's Laboratory Row in 1912 (left to right): Horticulture, Bacteriology, Botany, Dairy, Entomology, and Agriculture. All but Agriculture Hall have since been renamed.

== Buildings ==
=== Morrill Hall of Agriculture ===
Built in 1909, in a neo-classical design, Agriculture Hall was the largest building at what was then State Agricultural College, when it opened. It still houses the College of Agriculture and Natural Resources. In 1999, on New Year Eve, the building was subject to an act of eco terrorism when the it was set on fire by the members of the Earth Liberation Front, causing more than $1 million of damage protesting research involving genetically modified crops being conducted at the university. In 2008, four people were arrested and charged with setting the fire and later convicted After the original Morrill Hall was demolished in 2013, the building was renamed the Justin S. Morrill Hall of Agriculture, after the Vermont senator who wrote the act establishing the land-grant college system.

=== Cook Hall ===
Opened 1889 as the Agriculture Laboratory it was the first agricultural laboratory at the State Agricultural College. It then became known as Entomology, the Department of Entomology occupied the space after Agriculture Hall opened in 1909 until 1948 when the Natural Sciences Building was constructed. The building is named after Dr. Albert John Cook, a Professor of Zoology and Entomology at the school from 1868 to 1893. Today it serves as office space for various departments within the College of Agriculture and Natural Resources.

=== Chittenden Hall ===
Originally the Dairy Building and later the Forestry Building, the building now called Chittenden Hall was completed in 1901. It became home to the Forestry Department when a new Dairy building was built in 1912. Forestry moved from the building in 1966, when the Natural Resources Building opened. The building is named after Alfred K. Chittenden, a Professor of Forestry from 1914 until his death in 1930.

=== Eustace–Cole Hall ===
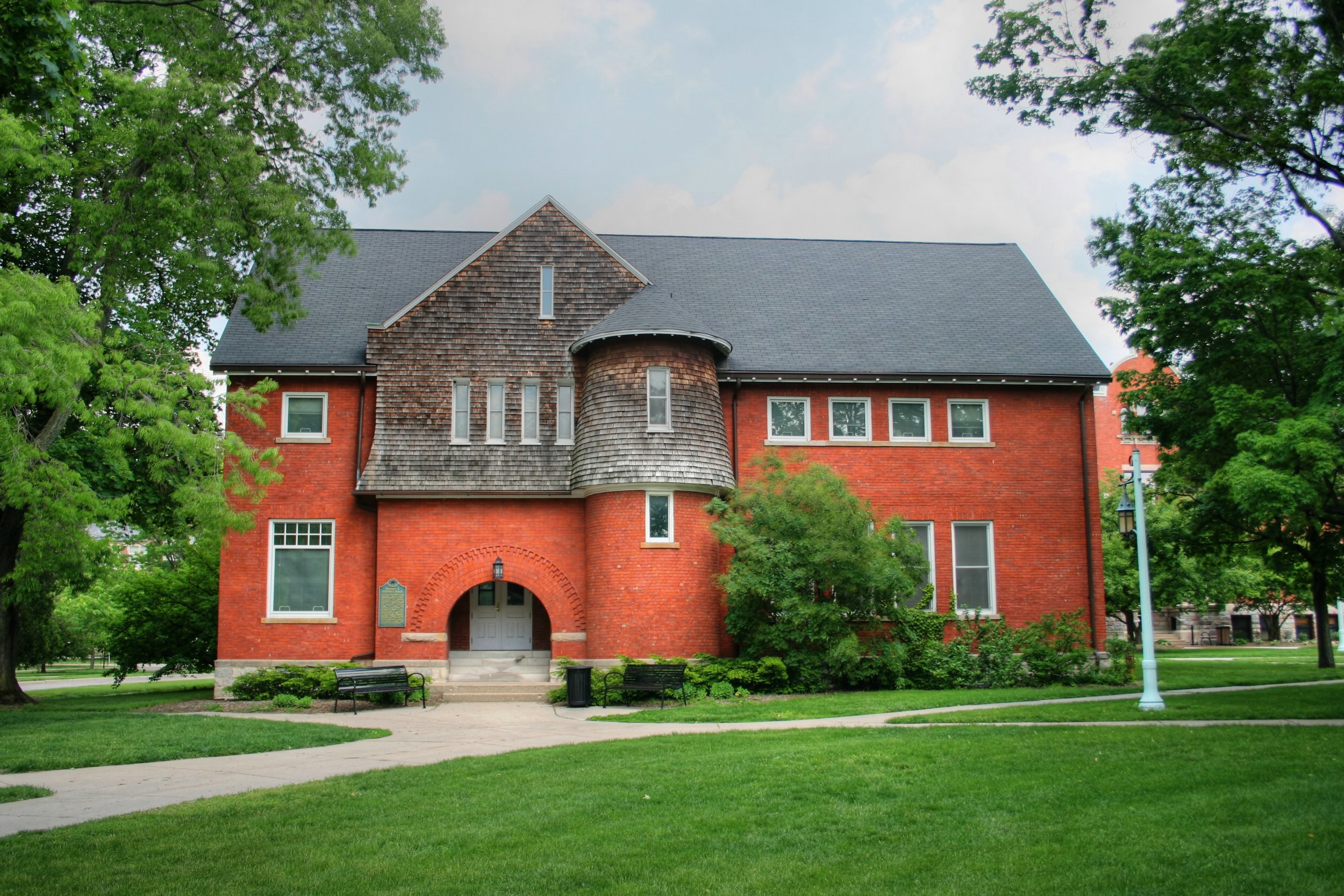
Eustace-Cole hall is home to the Michigan State University Honors College.

Formerly University College Building and Horticultural Laboratory, Harry J. Eustace Hall is the only building on Michigan State's main campus that is on the National Register of Historic Places. It is the third oldest extant building on the Michigan State campus. Originally designed as a laboratory for horticulturist Liberty Hyde Bailey in 1888, who designed it as the first distinctively horticultural laboratory in the United States. This building housed the horticulture department until 1924, when the new horticulture building, now known as Old Horticulture, opened. The building was renamed in 1961 after Harry J. Eustace, who chaired Horticulture Department from 1908 to 1918. In 1999 the building underwent a $3 million renovation thanks to a donation by alumni Jeffery and Kathryn Cole, being renamed in their honor. Eustace-Cole now serves as the headquarters of Michigan State University Honors College.

=== Marshall-Adams Hall ===
The Bacteriology Laboratory opened in 1902 and was the first free standing bacteriology laboratory in the United States. The building housed the Department of Bacteriology and Hygiene, now known as Microbiology and Molecular Genetics. The department stayed there until 1952 when it moved to Giltner Hall. The building was originally named Marshall Hall in honor of Charles Edward Marshall, the first department head. In 2002, following a renovation funded by Michigan State University trustee Randall Pittman, Pittman requested that it be renamed for university president and Professor of Economics Walter Adams. The Department of Economics houses it offices in the building today.

=== Old Botany ===
Built in 1892, it replaced a Botany building located in the Beal Gardens that was destroyed by fire in 1890.

=== Veterinary Laboratory ===
The Veterinary Laboratory was built in 1885 on a site just west of Agriculture Hall, it is the only building that was part of Lab Row to have been demolished. The lab was supplanted by a new veterinary clinic in 1913 and was torn down in 1930 when the new Anatomy Building, the first phase of what is now Giltner Hall, was built.
