= T. B. Simon Power Plant =

Power plant in East Lansing, Michigan, United States

T.B. Simon Power Plant
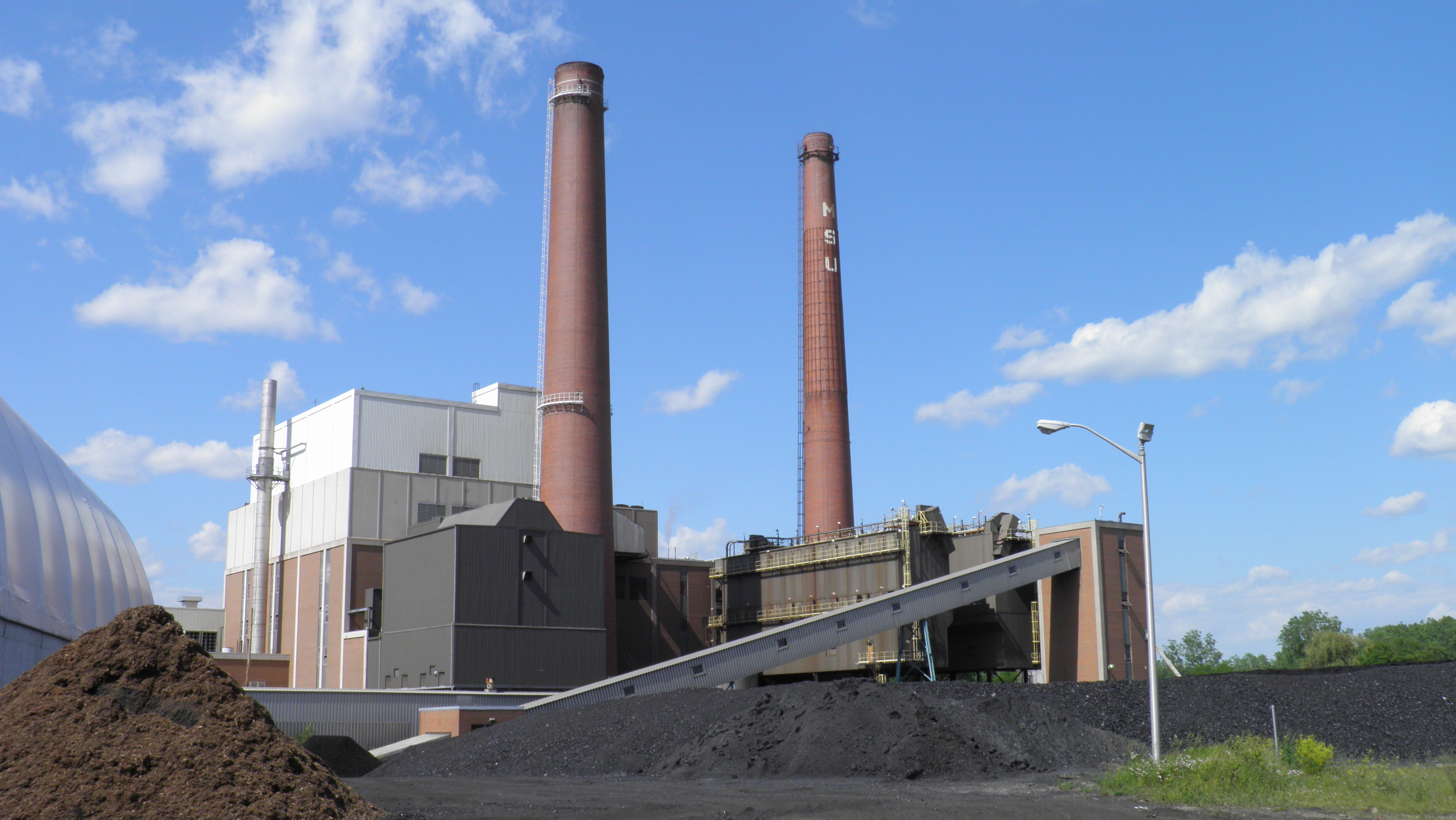
- T. B. Simon Power Plant, south view (2011)
- Country: United States
- Location: Michigan State University, East Lansing, Michigan
- Coordinates: 42.71759°N 84.48439°W
- Status: Operational
- Owner: Michigan State University

Thermal power station
- Primary fuel: Natural gas
- Tertiary fuel: Biofuel
- Cogeneration?: Yes

Power generation
- Units operational: 9
- Nameplate capacity: 99.3 MW

External links
- Commons: Related media on Commons

The T.B. Simon Power Plant is a multi-fuel cogeneration facility located on the campus of Michigan State University in East Lansing, Michigan, United States. The Simon Power Plant is the principal provider of electricity and district heating to the 50,000-student main campus.

Pressurized steam is distributed throughout the campus through an extensive network of tunnels to provide both heating and cooling to approximately 500 instructional, research, and residential buildings located on more than 5,000 acres (2,000 ha). Electrical power is distributed through the same tunnels, making the campus relatively immune from outages due to weather.

The primary fuel for T. B. Simon is natural gas. Simon's east smokestack identifies its operator with the letters "MSU" in white brick.

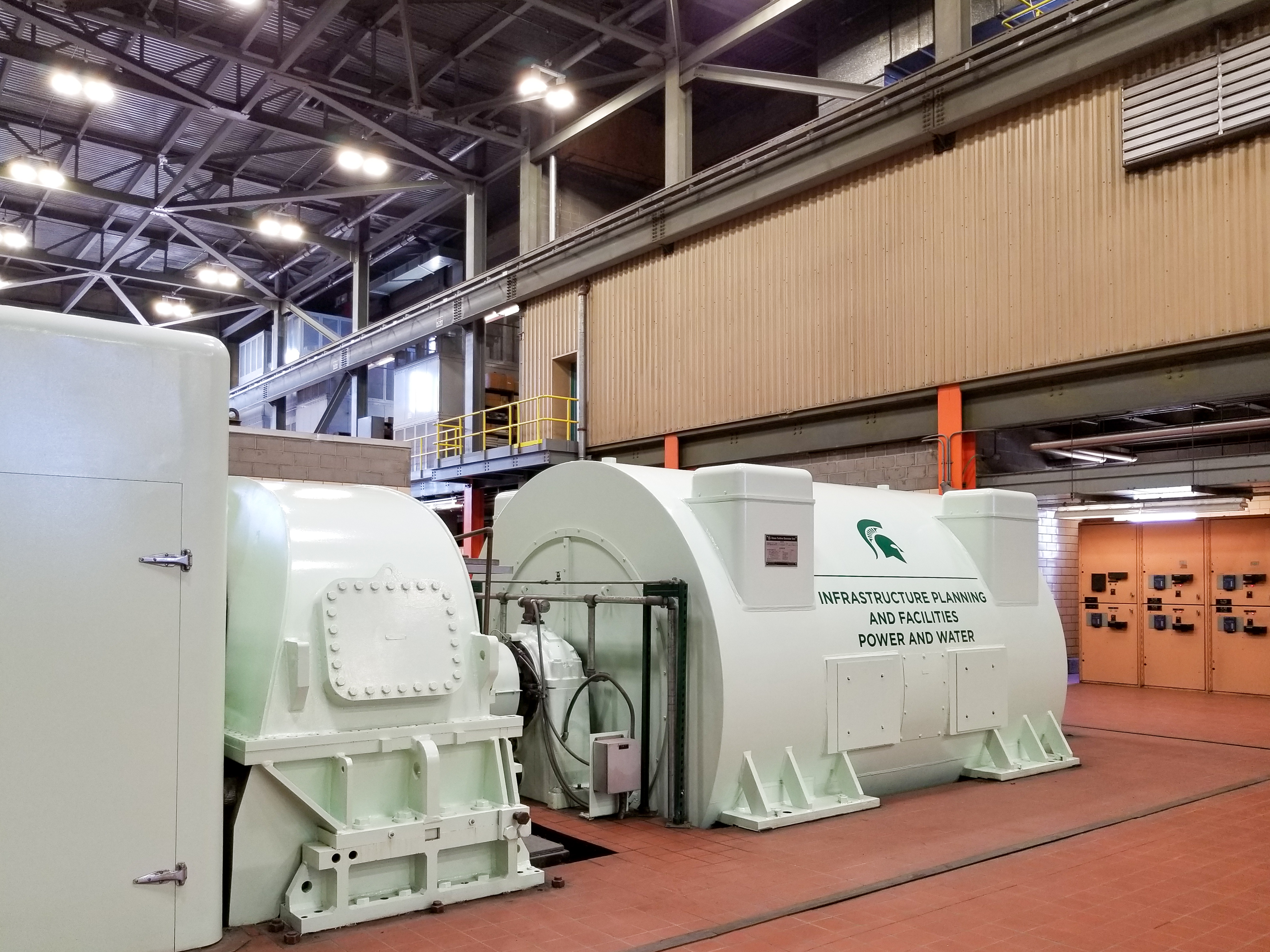
Interior

== History ==
The first electric lights on the campus were powered by a dam on the Grand River, five miles away. The dam was succeeded by a generator fitted at the recently built Boiler House in 1894.

The second Boiler House, built in 1904, provided both steam and electric power to the growing campus. Some 4,100 feet (1,200 m) of underground steam and power distribution tunnels were built at the same time, at a cost of $140,000, equivalent to $3.81 million in 2024.

By 1921, the second Boiler House had been incorporated into a larger power plant, which saw a major expansion in 1939, and operated until 1966. The site of the third power plant is now occupied by the lawn of the Hannah Administration Building.

The fourth power plant on the MSU campus was the Shaw Lane Power Plant, built in 1948 near Spartan Stadium. Like its three predecessors, the Shaw Lane plant was coal-fired, receiving its coal from the Pere Marquette railroad spur on the west side of the building.

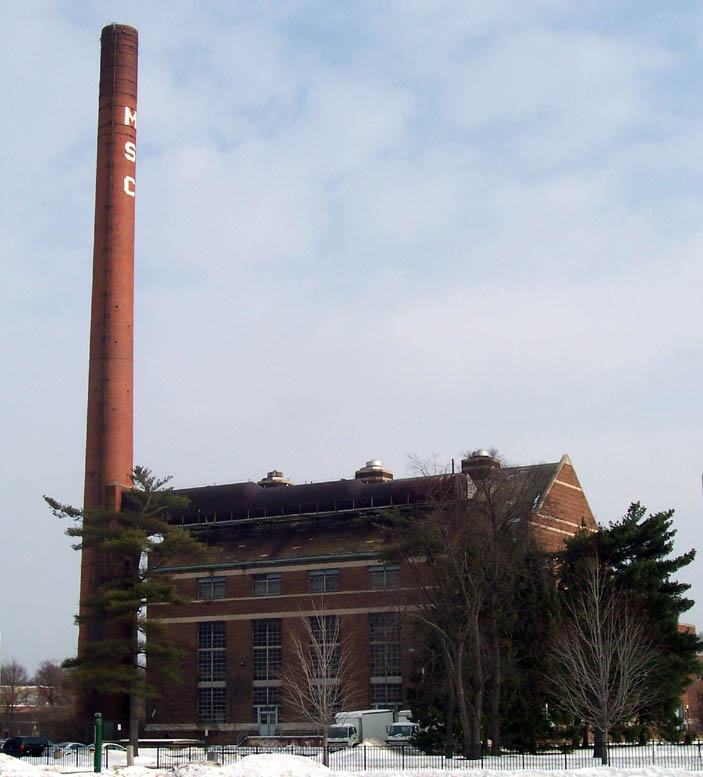
The former Shaw Lane plant in 2005, showing the "MSC" smokestack

Shaw Lane was deactivated as a power plant in 1975, though it continued to house an electrical substation. The plant's 239-foot (73 m) smokestack bearing the letters "MSC" (for Michigan State College) was a campus landmark until its demolition in 2011. The remainder of the plant's structure was converted to a new STEM Teaching and Learning Facility, opening in 2021.

The Simon facility is the fifth power plant to be located on the Michigan State campus. Its first six generating units were built in four stages between 1965 and 2006. The continued use of cogeneration supports the unique demands of Michigan State University, one of the largest university campuses in the nation. Three natural gas engines, each generating 9.4 MW, were installed in February 2022. These produce only electricity and not steam.

The $23 million 2006 addition is a combined-cycle plant, consisting of a conventional pulverized-coal steam turbine/generator (Unit 5) and a natural gas combustion turbine with heat-recovery steam generator (Unit 6). Unit 6 gives the Simon plant black start capability in the event of a general power outage.

The plant was converted to operate entirely on natural gas in 2016. Local electric and gas utility Consumers Energy provided technical assistance for the conversion, and supplied the natural gas.

== Namesake ==
The plant's namesake is Theodore "Ted" Simon. Simon is the father-in-law of former University President Lou Anna Simon.

Simon graduated from MSU, then known as the Michigan State College of Agriculture and Applied Sciences, in 1942. He returned to the university as an assistant construction engineer, and was promoted to the Superintendent of Buildings and Facilities in the mid-1950s. Simon continued in leadership roles in the MSU Physical Plant until his retirement in 1984.

In addition to his work at Michigan State, Simon was a founding member of the Michigan Association of Physical Plant Administrators.

== Technology ==
As of 2016, MSU's Simon Plant operates entirely on natural gas. Prior to 2016, MSU's Simon plant burned approximately 250,000 tons of low-sulfur Eastern coal, principally from Kentucky, and also burned biofuels to supplement coal.

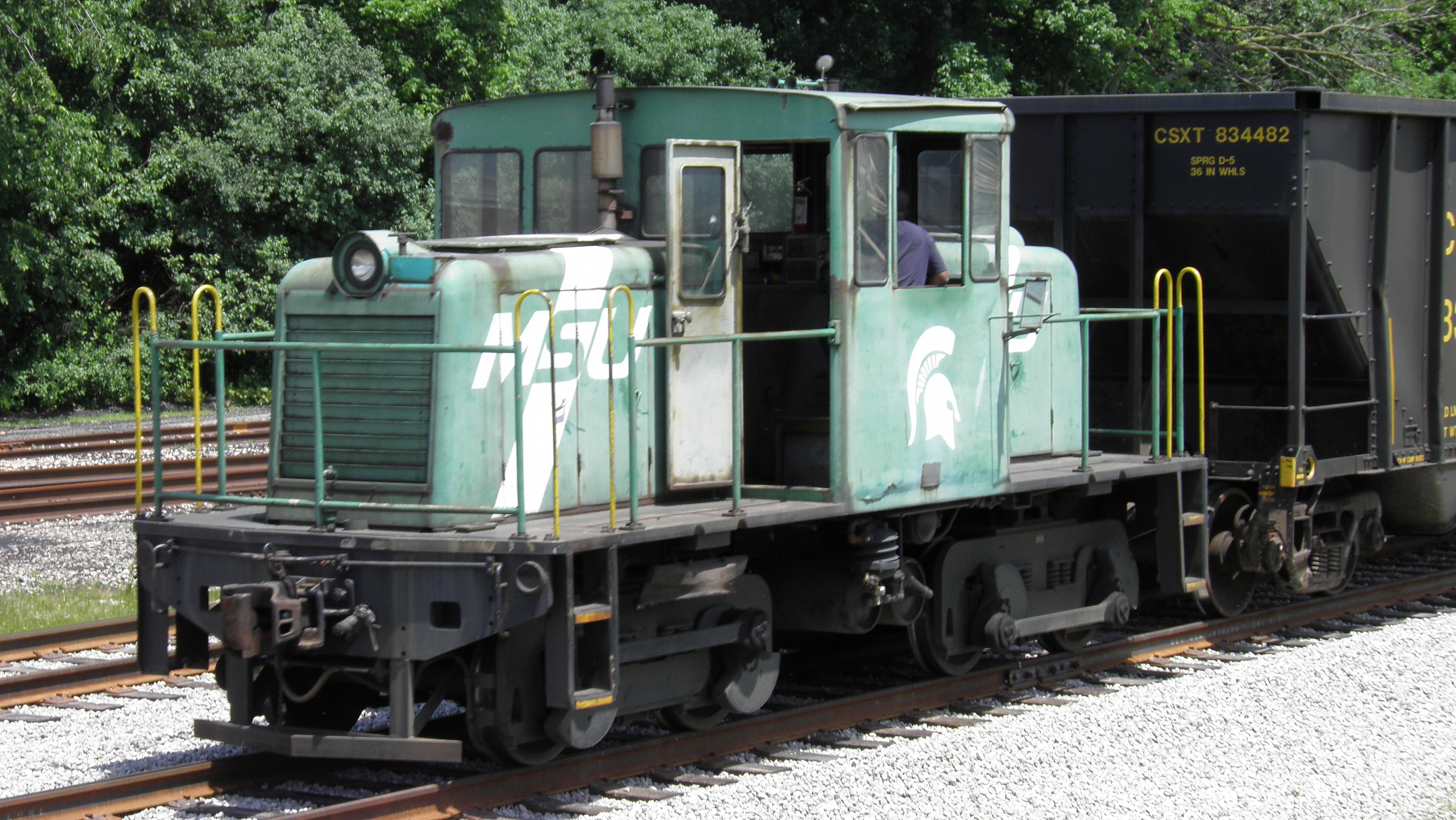
The yard locomotive used for moving coal cars, shown in 2011 before the facility's conversion to natural gas

The total nameplate capacity of the facility is approximately 100 megawatts.

The facility is divided into six units, built in four phases. Units 1-6 are cogeneration units, which produced superheated steam at 900 psi which is used to drive a turbine/generator, emerging at 90 psi for distribution to campus buildings through a system of tunnels. Steam condensate is returned from campus to the plant via the same tunnels to be cleaned and reused. Since both usable steam and electricity are produced in a single process, the combined energy efficiency is approximately 60 percent, twice that of an electric-only unit.

Unit 7-9 are electric generators only with no cogeneration capacity.

Unit number	Date built	Capacity	Technology	Original fuel type	Notes
1	1965	12.5 MW	Dry-bottom wall-fired boiler	Coal	Initial construction
2	1965	12.5 MW	Dry-bottom wall-fired boiler	Coal	Built in tandem with Unit 1
3	1973	15 MW	Dry-bottom wall-fired boiler	Coal	
4	1993	21 MW	Circulating fluidized bed	Coal and biofuel	
5	2006	24 MW	Heat recovery steam generator (HRSG)	Natural gas	
6	2006	14 MW	Natural gas-fired turbine with dry low-NO_{x} burner	Natural gas	Waste heat from gas turbine heats HRSG
7	2022	9.4 MW	Reciprocating internal combustion engine	Natural gas	Electric-only
8	2022	9.4 MW	Reciprocating internal combustion engine	Natural gas	Electric-only
9	2022	9.4 MW	Reciprocating internal combustion engine	Natural gas	Electric-only

== Steam tunnels ==
The plant's steam production is carried through campus in over 10 miles (16 km) of secure steam tunnels. James Dallas Egbert III, a gifted but troubled 16-year-old MSU student, entered the steam tunnels on August 15, 1979, with the intention of committing suicide there. News reports of his disappearance erroneously claimed that Egbert had gotten lost in the tunnels while playing a real-life version of Dungeons & Dragons.

== Emissions and environment ==
The Simon plant is operated under permits from the Michigan Department of Environment Quality. Though Unit 4's fluidized bed combustion produces more efficient burning at a lower temperature and Units No. 5 and 6 only burn natural gas, the plant remains a significant emitter of several pollutants, and the principal source of greenhouse gas (GHG) emissions on campus:

- CO_{2} (carbon dioxide) - 542,606 tons (2009)
- SO_{x} (sulfur oxides) - 2,812 tons (2009)
- NO_{x} (nitrogen oxides) - 811 (2009)
- PM10 (particulates) - 12 tons (2009) with MSU receiving a 2009 permit to burn up to 4,000 tons of wood and switchgrass annually. In 2011, the university requested permits covering an additional 24,000 tons of biofuel per year.

In 2010, MSU was fined $27,000 by the Michigan Department of Environmental Quality (MDEQ) for two 2008 violations of its operating permit: the burning of wet coal, which resulted in excessive NO_{x} emissions; and the improper blending of coal, which resulted in excess sulfur dioxide emissions.

"MSU Beyond Coal," a campaign launched in 2010 in association with the Sierra Club, is lobbying the university to transition "away from coal to 100% clean, renewable energy sources." Student activists are trying to leverage the school's own "Be Spartan Green" environmental-consciousness initiative to pressure the university into committing to a target date for giving up coal.

While emission targets can also be addressed by managing demand, as of 2006 the MSU campus already had the lowest per-capita and per-square foot energy consumption in the Big Ten.

== See also ==
- List of power stations in Michigan
