= Michigan Farm Bureau Pavilion =

Convention center

Farm Bureau Pavilion at Michigan State University
- MSU Pavilion
- Interactive map of Farm Bureau Pavilion at Michigan State University
- Former names: Michigan State University Pavilion (1996-2024)
- Location: 4301 Farm Ln; Lansing, Michigan 48910; United States
- Coordinates: 42°42′25.8156″N 84°28′47.2296″W
- Owner: Michigan State University

Construction
- Opened: 1996

Website
- canr.msu.edu/pavlion

The Farm Bureau Pavilion at Michigan State University (formerly the Michigan State University Pavilion for Agriculture and Livestock Education and popularly shortened to MSU Pavilion) is a convention center located in East Lansing, Michigan on the campus of Michigan State University. It was built in 1996. It has 101,527 square feet (9,432 m^{2}) of exhibit space.

Facilities include a 2,000-seat indoor arena with 24,396 square feet (2,266 m^{2}) of floor space, used for trade shows, concerts, sporting events, livestock shows and other events; a 364-seat auditorium for meetings and livestock auctions; and a 77,131-square-foot (7,166 m^{2}) exhibit hall for trade shows, conventions and other events.

The complex also contains 2,930 square feet (272 m^{2}) of meeting rooms (there are three meeting rooms that can divide into four meeting rooms.) The complex also features a 10 kilowatt solar power photovoltaic system, a state-of-the-art sound system, a campground with space for 96 campsites; and parking for 1500 cars.

On December 4, 2024, the Michigan Farm Bureau announced a partnership with Michigan State University to invest into expanding the MSU Pavilion. As a result, the complex was renamed to the Michigan Farm Bureau Pavilion.
