= Turner House =

Turner House or Turner Farm or variations may refer to:

== Structures ==
=== United States ===
- White-Turner-Sanford House, Huntsville, Alabama
- Richardson-Turner House, Lexa, Arkansas
- Turner House (Little Rock, Arkansas)
- Turner-Ledbetter House, Little Rock, Arkansas
- Kate Turner House, Magnolia, Arkansas
- Dr. Philip Turner House, Norwichtown, Connecticut
- Charles E. Turner House, Columbus, Georgia, listed on the NRHP in Muscogee County, Georgia
- Patterson-Turner Homeplace, Hartwell, Georgia, listed on the NRHP in Hart County, Georgia
- Williamson-Maley-Turner Farm, Jefferson, Georgia, listed on the NRHP in Jackson County, Georgia
- Phillips-Turner-Kelly House, Monticello, Georgia, listed on the NRHP in Jasper County, Georgia
- Henry Gray Turner House, Quitman, Georgia
- Walden-Turner House, Stockbridge, Georgia, listed on the NRHP in Henry County, Georgia
- John G. Turner House, Richfield, Idaho, listed on the NRHP in Lincoln County, Idaho
- McCairn-Turner House, Goodland, Indiana
- Francis A. and Rose M. Turner House, Avoca, Iowa
- Susie P. Turner Double House, Des Moines, Iowa
- Fred G. Turner House, North English, Iowa
- William Thomas Turner Barn, Gardner, Kansas
- Judge Jim Turner House, Paintsville, Kentucky, listed on the NRHP in Johnson County, Kentucky
- Squire Turner House, Richmond, Kentucky, listed on the NRHP in Madison County, Kentucky
- Turner House (Richmond, Kentucky), listed on the NRHP in Madison County, Kentucky
- Turner-Fitzpatrick House, Richmond, Kentucky, listed on the NRHP in Madison County, Kentucky
- J.L. Turner and Son Building, Scottsville, Kentucky
- S. F. Turner and Company Steam Flouring and Grist Mill, Springfield, Kentucky, listed on the NRHP in Washington County, Kentucky
- Turner's Hall, New Orleans, Louisiana, listed on the NRHP in Orleans Parish, Louisiana
- Turner Farm II, North Haven, Maine
- Turner Farm Site, North Haven, Maine
- Turner Town House, Turner, Maine
- Turner Hill, Ipswich, Massachusetts
- Stephen Turner House, Norfolk, Massachusetts
- Turner House (Grand Rapids, Michigan)
- Smith-Turner House, Lansing, Michigan
- Turner-Dodge House, Lansing, Michigan
- Gordon Cole and Kate D. Turner House, Faribault, Minnesota, listed on the NRHP in Rice County, Minnesota
- Turner Hall (New Ulm, Minnesota)
- Turner-Pharr House, Clarksville, Missouri
- George and Nancy Turner House, Fremont, Nebraska
- Turner–Chew–Carhart Farm, near Clinton, New Jersey
- Turner House (New York), an 1840s house for which a garden was designed in the 1960s by landscape architect Fletcher Steele
- Winslow-Turner Carriage House, Plattsburgh, New York
- Neill-Turner-Lester House, Sherrills Ford, North Carolina
- John T. and Mary Turner House, Raleigh, North Carolina
- Henry Turner House and Caldwell-Turner Mill Site, Statesville, North Carolina
- John E. Turner House, Holdenville, Oklahoma
- Frederick Turner Fourplex, Portland, Oregon
- R. Perry Turner House, Greer, South Carolina
- Robert G. Turner House, Greer, South Carolina
- Frank and Clara Turner House, Faulkton, South Dakota
- Ida New and William Madison Turner Farm, Lebanon, Tennessee
- Joe E. Turner House, Itasca, Texas, listed on the NRHP in Hill County, Texas
- James Turner House, Marshall, Texas
- Fred and Juliette Turner House, Midland, Texas
- Turner-White-McGee House, Roganville, Texas, listed on the NRHP in Jasper County, Texas
- Turner–LaRowe House, Charlottesville, Virginia
- Old Turner Place, Henry, Virginia
- Turner-Koepf House, Seattle, Washington, listed on the NRHP in King County, Washington
- Luther P. and Jane Marie Turner House, Spokane, Washington, listed on the NRHP in Spokane County, Washington
- Priscilla Strode Turner House, Beddington, West Virginia
- Turner Hall (Milwaukee), a National Historic Landmark

=== United Kingdom ===
- Turner House Gallery, an art gallery in Penarth, Wales
- Turner House, London headquarters of Turner Broadcasting System Europe

== Other uses ==
- The Turner House, a 2015 novel by Angela Flounoy

== See also ==
- Turner Historic District, Cypert, Arkansas
- Turner Hall (disambiguation)
