= Brown-Price House =

- U.S. National Register of Historic Places
- Michigan State Historic Site
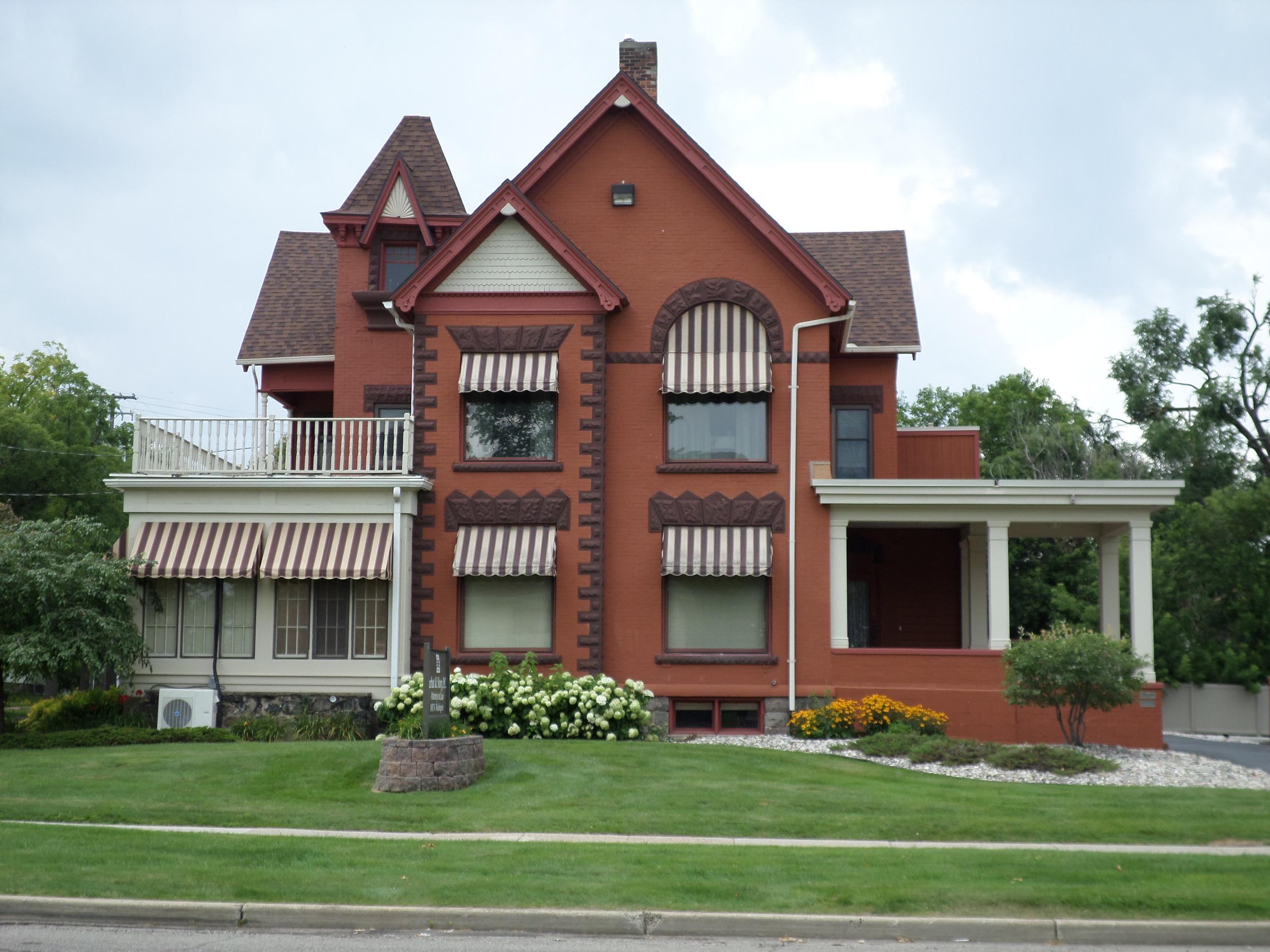
- Interactive map
- Location: 1003 N. Washington Ave., Lansing, Michigan
- Coordinates: 42°44′42″N 84°33′09″W
- Area: less than one acre
- Built: 1890
- Architect: Darius B. Moon
- Architectural style: Queen Anne
- NRHP reference No.: 84001429
- Added to NRHP: March 22, 1984

The Brown-Price House is a former single-family home located at 1003 North Washington Avenue in Lansing, Michigan. It was listed on the National Register of Historic Places in 1984. As of 2018, it was used as offices for a law firm.

== History ==
William Clark Brown was born in McHenry County, Illinois in 1848, and moved to Lansing in 1876 to enter the lumber business. He formed a partnership with William B. Stone and George W. Stanton in 1880, manufacturing lumber and woodwork under the name W.B. Stone & Co. Brown ran the company's yard in North Lansing. In 1883, Brown purchased a lot for his house, selling half to Stone. Brown re-purchased Stone's half in 1890, and engaged Lansing architect Darius B. Moon to design a house. Construction began in 1890, and likely lasted through 1894 or 1895, because of an illness Brown suffered.

Brown lived in this house until his death in 1909. In 1912, his wife Ella Brown sold the house to Lawrence and Julia A. Price. Price was born in 1843 in County Tipperary, Ireland and emigrated to the United States with his family in 1849, settling in Lewiston, New York. Price served in the Civil War, then moved to Michigan to farm in 1866. In 1880 he opened a grocery in Flint, Michigan, then moved to Lansing in 1883. He purchased a lumber yard in about 1888, and went on to head other companies in the area, including Price & Smith (a North Lansing hardware stone), the Lansing Brewing Company, the Auto Body Works (manufacturer of automobile bodies), of the Hildreth Motor & Pump Company, and the Peerless Motor Company.

Price lived in the house until his death in 1917; after his death he willed nearly $100,000 to the Sisters of Mercy to found the St. Lawrence Hospital (now part of the Sparrow Health System). His wife Julia lived in the house until her death in 1931, when she bequeathed the house to St. Lawrence. The hospital sold it in 1935, and from 1938 to 1981 it was used as the Lavey Funeral Home. In 1982, the Michigan State Podiatry Association purchased the building, and rehabilitated it in 1983. As of 2018, it was used as offices for a law firm. In December 2022 the building was purchased by Brian Town and Michigan Creative.

== Description ==
The Brown-Price House is a large two-and-one-half-story brick Queen Anne structure. It is generally L-shaped, with a pyramid-roof, square tower in the angle of the L. It sits on a foundation of rock-face, brown sandstone, topped by a plain water table. The exterior is trimmed with sandstone, including window sills and lintels and other decorative elements. Additional trim of wood includes paneled bargeboards and shingling, and other decorations in the gables, and a paired-bracket cornice in the tower. The main entrance was originally located near the tower, but has been moved to a porch on the northeast section.
