= Turner Museum =

Turner Museum may refer to

- Turner Museum of Glass, housed in the Department of Engineering Materials at the University of Sheffield, England, founded by W.E.S. Turner
- Fred Turner Folk and Culture Museum, in Loeriesfontein, South Africa
- Turner Contemporary, a gallery and visual arts organization in Margate, Kent, England, celebrating J.M.W. Turner's association with that town
- Turner Curling Museum, in Weyburn, Saskatchewan, Canada
- Janet Turner Print Museum, at California State University, Chico
- Turner Museum & Historical Association, in Turner, Maine, USA, housed in the original Leavitt Area High School
- Enoch Turner School, a schoolhouse museum in Toronto, Canada

== See also ==
- Turner House (disambiguation)
- Turner Gallery (disambiguation)
