= Christman Building =

Christman Building may refer to:

- Christman Building (Lansing, Michigan)
- Christman Building (Joplin, Missouri), a prominent contributing building in the Fifth and Main Historic District
