= Turner Gallery =

Turner Gallery may refer to:

- The Clore Gallery at the Tate Britain, London, England, housing work by J. M. W. Turner
- Turner Contemporary, a contemporary art gallery in Margate, Kent, England
- Turner House Gallery, a gallery in Penarth, Wales, originally built to house a collection of Turner paintings

== See also ==
- Turner Museum (disambiguation)
- Turner House (disambiguation)
