= Pelham Ballenger =

American baseball player (1894–1948)

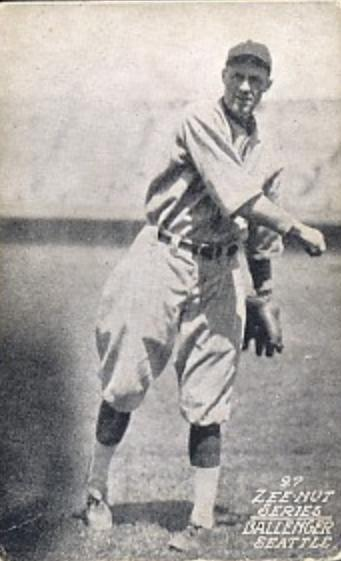
- Third baseman
- Born: February 6, 1894; Gilreath's Mill, South Carolina, U.S.
- Died: December 8, 1948 (aged 54); Greenville County, South Carolina, U.S.
- Batted: Right Threw: Right

MLB debut
- May 7, 1928, for the Minnesota Twins

Last MLB appearance
- May 12, 1928, for the Minnesota Twins

MLB statistics
- Batting average: .111
- Home runs: 0
- Runs batted in: 0
- Stats at Baseball Reference

Teams
- Washington Senators (1928)

Pelham Ashby Ballenger (February 6, 1894 – December 8, 1948) was an American Major League Baseball third baseman, for at least a week, with the Washington Senators in 1928. He was a native of Gilreath's Mill, South Carolina, United States.

He made his debut on May 7 and played his final game on May 12. In three games he was 1-for-9 (.111) and handled nine chances without making an error.

Ballenger died in 1948 in Greenville County, South Carolina.
