= Arthur Barnwell House =

Historic house in South Carolina, United States

- U.S. National Register of Historic Places
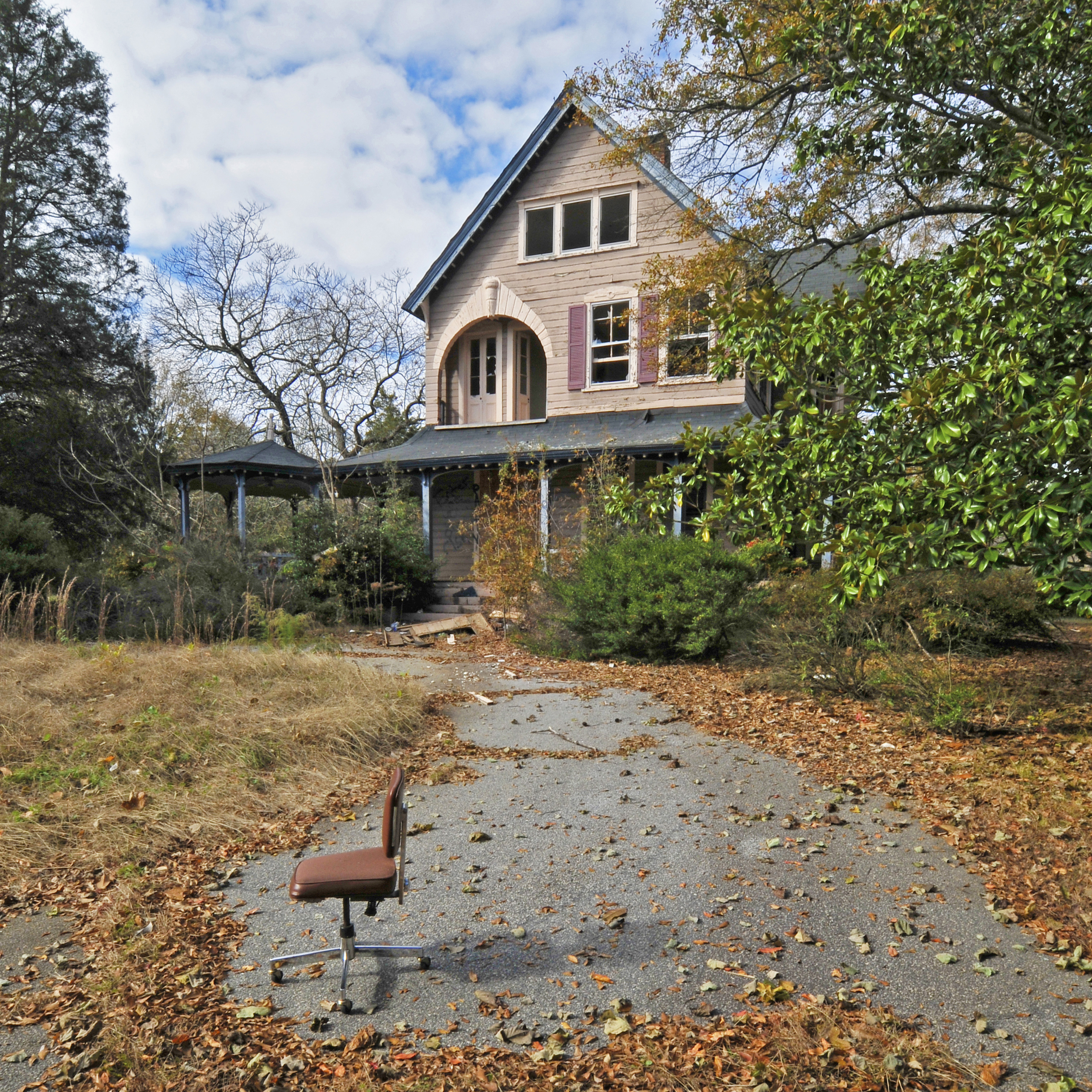

- Location within South Carolina Location within the United States
- Nearest city: Greer, South Carolina
- Coordinates: 34°51′18″N 82°13′41″W
- Area: 4.4 acres (1.8 ha)
- Built: 1900
- Architectural style: Queen Anne
- NRHP reference No.: 82003867
- Added to NRHP: March 19, 1982

The Arthur Barnwell House, which is also known as the Barnwell-DeCamps House, is a Queen Anne house in Greer, South Carolina that was built in the period 1880–1900. It was named to the National Register of Historic Places on 1982. As of 2013, the house was in the process of being moved and rebuilt at a new location.

== History ==
The house was built for the first president of Pelham Manufacturing Company, Arthur Barnwell, on the banks of the Enoree River. The ruins of Pelham Mill and the Pelham mill village are on the opposite side of the river. It was believed to be built some time between 1880 and 1900.

It has been disassembled in ca 2015 and the parts are now forgotten and rotting on a location at Abner Creek Road. The original location is now a leveled and barren lot.

== Architecture ==
The house is a wood frame, two and one-half story Queene Anne house. Its irregular plan has bays projecting toward the southwest and northeast sides. The kitchen is a one-story ell on the northwest side. The residence has ship-lap siding. The steep, gabled roof has composition shingles over the original metal roof.
