= Greer station =

- Greer Depot
- U.S. National Register of Historic Places
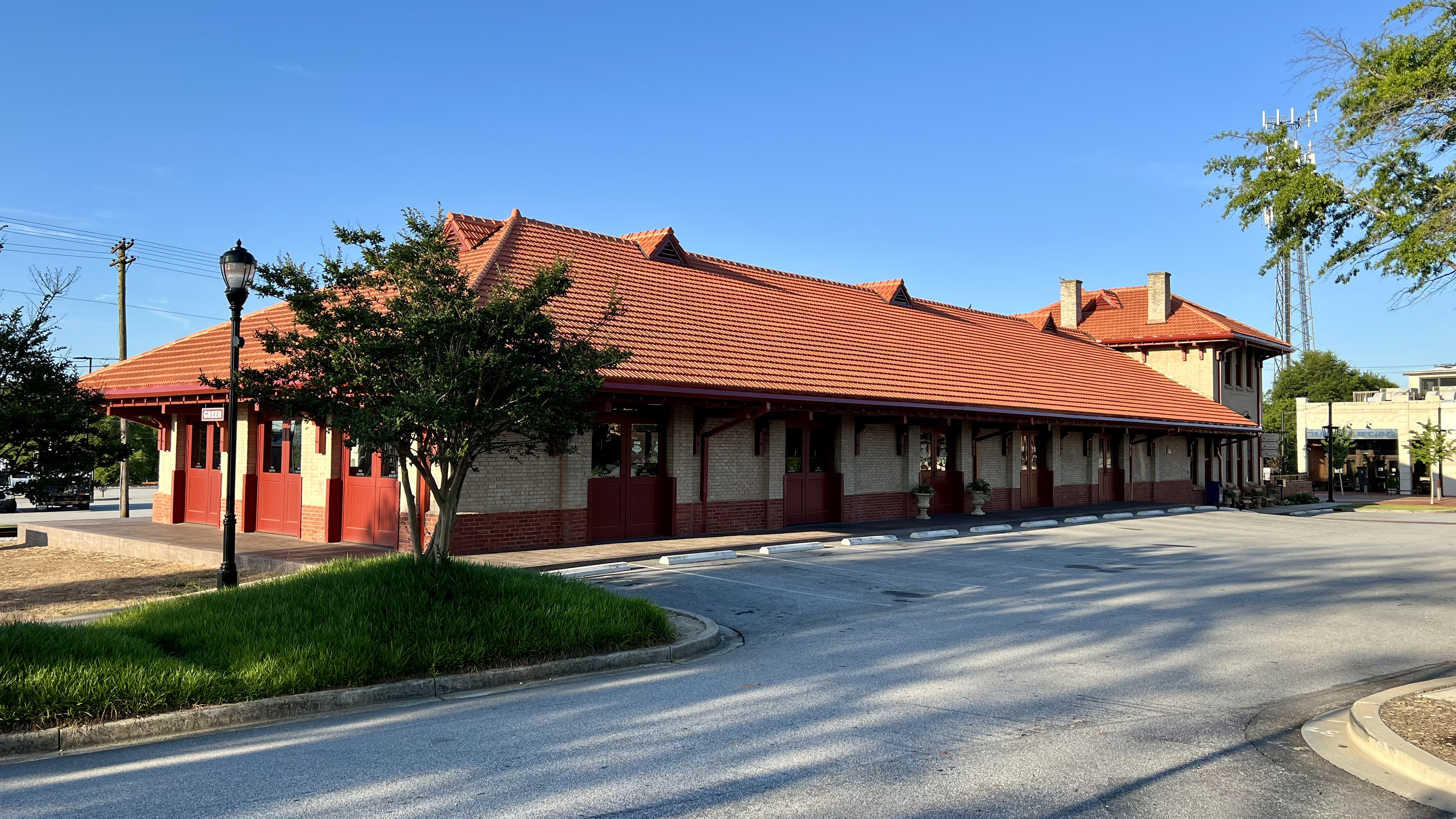
- Historic Greer Depot, 2022

- Location within South Carolina Location within the United States
- Location: 300 Randall Street., Greer, South Carolina
- Coordinates: 34.936346°N 82.225579°W
- Area: 0.5 acres (0.20 ha)
- Built: 1913
- Architect: Charles Christian Hook
- NRHP reference No.: 87000409
- Added to NRHP: March 6, 1987

The Greer Depot is a former railroad depot listed on the National Register of Historic Places and located in Greer, South Carolina. The combination passenger station and freight warehouse was designed by the Charlotte, North Carolina-based architect, Charles Christian Hook, and constructed in 1913 for the Piedmont and Northern Railway. The depot was designed as a combination passenger station and freight warehouse for the Piedmont & Northern Railway and later used by Seaboard Coast Line Railroad, before facing potential demolition in 1983. It is the last surviving of the original 5 two-story depots built for the railway.

The building has a yellow brick exterior on a wider red brick base. The hip roof is covered in red clay tile supported by a wood truss and timber plank system. The second story room of the depot served as Greer City Council Chambers from 1913 to 1937 and then served as a city record storage room until the 1950s. The depot, which had been boarded up and unused from the early 1970s until 1983, was saved from the wrecking ball by Greenville County Redevelopment Authority in 1984 before being sold to Station One Partnership in 1987. It was redeveloped and subdivided to create retail and commercial spaces from 1987 to 2020. The building was sold to Western Carolina Railway Service Corporation (WCRS) subsidiary Letchworth Properties, LLC, in 2017.

Redesignated as "Historic Greer Depot" in 2017, the building now serves as the General and Administrative offices of WCRS and its subsidiaries, hosts a boutique beer and wine store, as well as the Historic Greer Depot Event Venue & Meeting Space within the former warehouse space, following the August 2021 completion of a historic renovation of the entire structure. The indoor event space consists of a 3,700 sq. ft. main room, including modern ADA-accessible restrooms and a catering kitchen. In addition, a 900 sq. ft. outdoor rose garden space was added a part of the 2020–2021 renovation.

The Rose Garden was dedicated as the "Marlene Faye Holdsworth Hawkins Historic Greer Depot Memorial Rose Garden" on January 9, 2020. The former warehouse space was dedicated as the "Rudolph M. Hawkins Historic Greer Depot Event Venue & Meeting Space" on October 15, 2021. The latter dedication was timed to coincide 108 years to the day of the first Piedmont and Northern passenger train departing Greer Depot on October 15, 1913.
