= Davenport House (Greer, South Carolina) =

Historic house in South Carolina, United States

- U.S. National Register of Historic Places
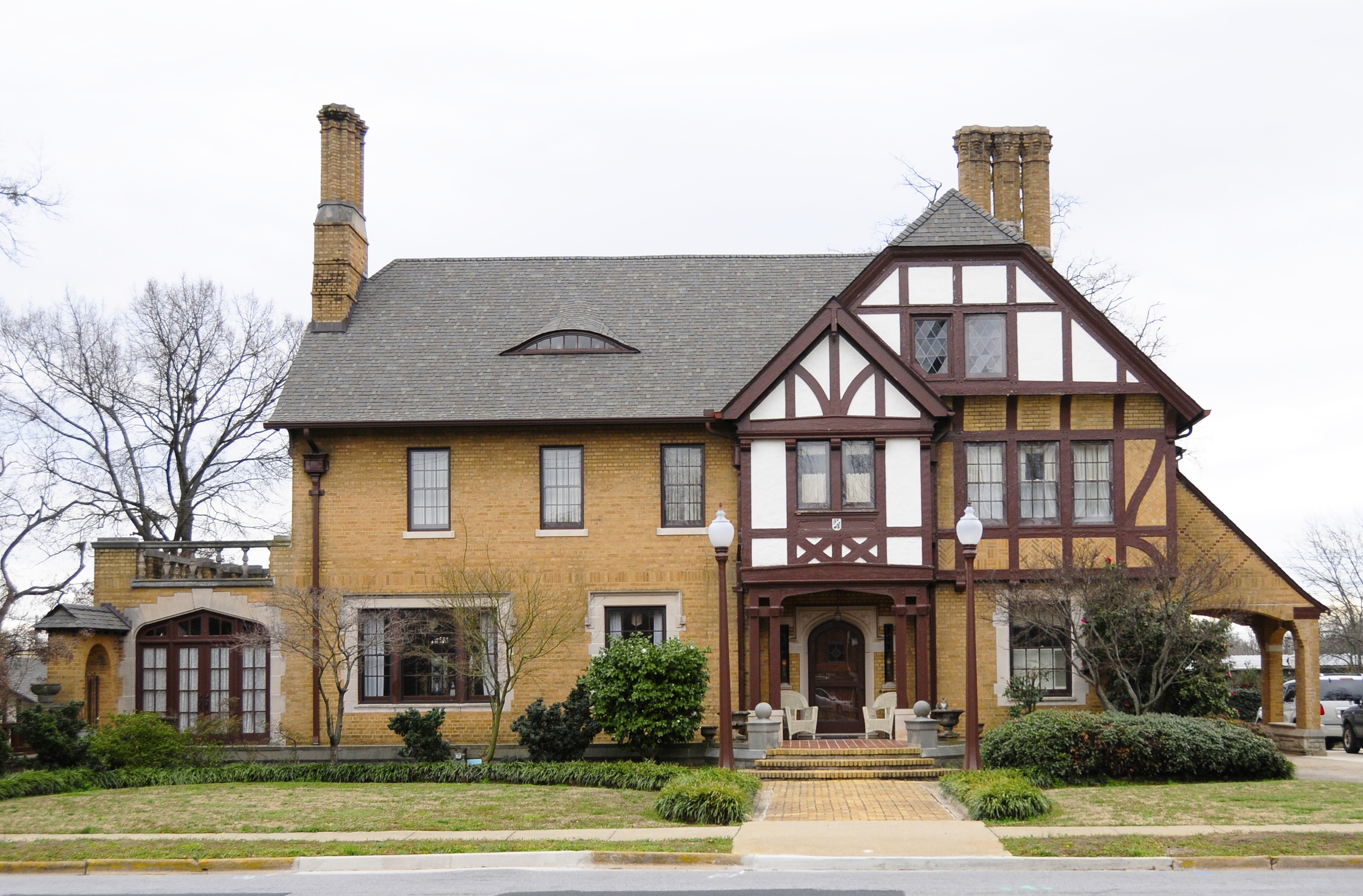

- Location within South Carolina Location within the United States
- Location: 100 Randall St., Greer, South Carolina
- Coordinates: 34°56′10″N 82°13′37″W
- Area: 2.5 acres (1.0 ha)
- Built: 1921
- Architect: James Douthit Beacham and Leon LeGrand
- Architectural style: Tudor Revival
- NRHP reference No.: 98001623
- Added to NRHP: February 1, 1999

The Davenport House is a Tudor Revival house built in 1921 in Greer, South Carolina The house was listed on the National Register of Historic Places in 1999.

== Architecture ==
The 6,000 ft^{2} (560 m^{2}) house was designed by Greenville architects James Douthit Beacham and Leon LeGrand. It is a two-story house constructed of hand-made yellow brick, timber, and stucco. It has a one-story, glass-enclosed porch on the east and porte cochere on the west. There is a three-bay coach house and pool house as well as a brick and timber pergola in the garden.
