= Greer Downtown Historic District =

Historic district in South Carolina, United States

- U.S. National Register of Historic Places
- U.S. Historic district
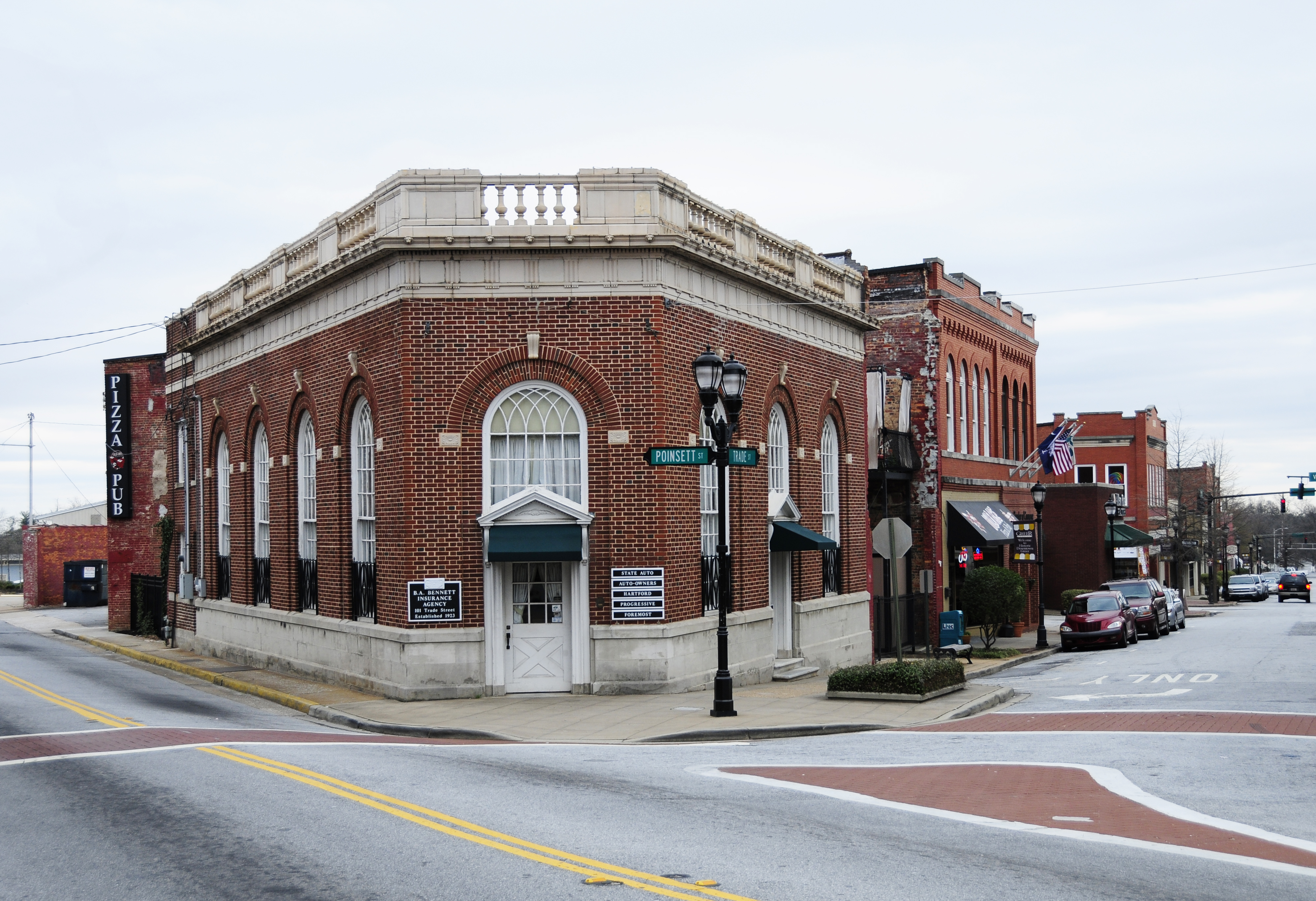
- Planters Savings Bank, Greer Downtown Historic District, February 2012

- Location within South Carolina Location within the United States
- Location: Roughly bounded by Trade, E. Poinsett, Randall, Victoria, and N. Main Sts., Greer, South Carolina
- Coordinates: 34°56′16″N 82°13′43″W
- Area: 7.8 acres (3.2 ha)
- Architect: Multiple
- Architectural style: Classical Revival, Late 19th And Early 20th Century American Movements
- NRHP reference No.: 97001156 (original); 100004447 (increase)

Significant dates
- Added to NRHP: September 18, 1997
- Boundary increase: September 30, 2019

Greer Downtown Historic District is a national historic district located at Greer, Greenville County, South Carolina.

== Geography ==
The district encompasses 40 contributing buildings constructed from ca. 1900 to ca. 1940, with the majority constructed between 1910 and 1930 in the central business district of Greer. They are largely two-story brick commercial structures. Notable buildings include the First National Bank of Greer, Planters Savings Bank, R. L. Merchant Building, Bailey Building, Bailes-Collins Department Store, and Davenport Building.

It was listed on the National Register of Historic Places in 1997, with boundary changes approved in 2019.
