= R. Perry Turner House =

Historic house in South Carolina, United States

- U.S. National Register of Historic Places
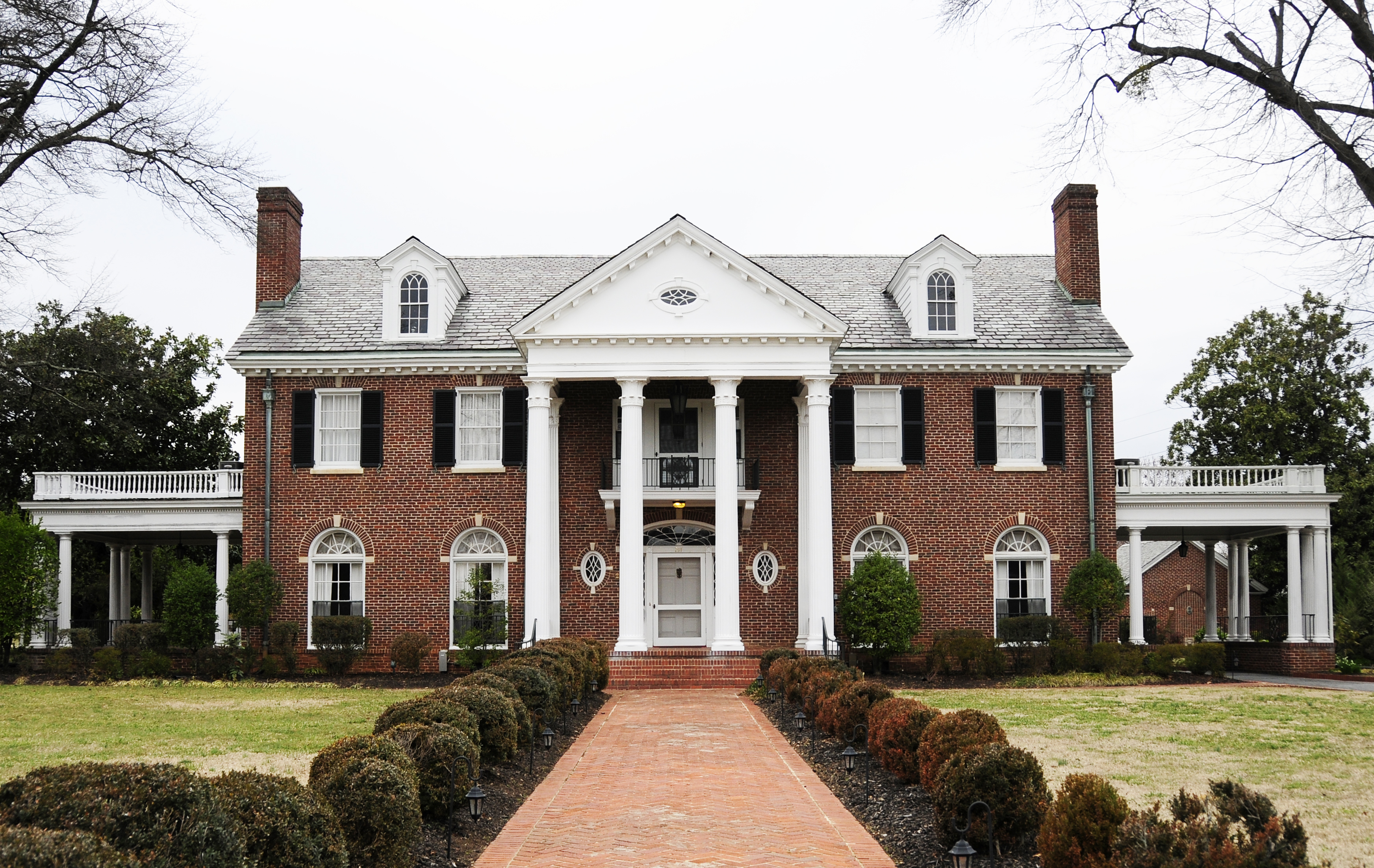
- R. Perry Turner House, 2012

- Location within South Carolina Location within the United States
- Location: 211 N. Main St., Greer, South Carolina
- Coordinates: 34.941663°N 82.225344°W
- Area: 2.5 acres (1.0 ha)
- Built: 1937
- Architect: William Riddle Ward
- Architectural style: Colonial Revival
- NRHP reference No.: 98001624
- Added to NRHP: February 1, 1999

The R. Perry Turner House is located in Greer, South Carolina. The Classical Revival style house was built in 1937 for prominent local businessman Richard Perry Turner. The house was designed by Greenville-based architect William Riddle Ward, commissioned after Turner saw the house designed by Ward for his younger brother, Robert Gibbs Turner.

The brick house on a poured concrete foundation is almost 10,000 square feet in size. A brick garage, stable and octagonal brick summer house in the backyard were also designed by Ward for the property.
