= Turner Hall =

Turner Hall (Turn Halle) were gathering places for German immigrant Turners and may refer to:

in the United States (by state)

- Turner Hall (Postville, Iowa), listed on the NRHP in Allamakee County, Iowa
- Northwest Davenport Turner Society Hall, listed on the NRHP in Scott County, Iowa
- Eldridge Turn-Halle, listed on the NRHP in Scott County, Iowa
- Turner's Hall, New Orleans, Louisiana, listed on the NRHP in Orleans Parish, Louisiana
- Turner Hall (New Ulm, Minnesota), listed on the NRHP in Brown County, Minnesota
- Turner Hall (Milwaukee, Wisconsin), a National Historic Landmark in Milwaukee County, Wisconsin
- Turner Hall, old concert hall of Dallas Symphony Orchestra

== See also ==
- Turner Town Hall, West Chicago, Illinois, listed on the NRHP in DuPage County, Illinois
- Turner House (disambiguation)
