= Greer, South Carolina =

- City
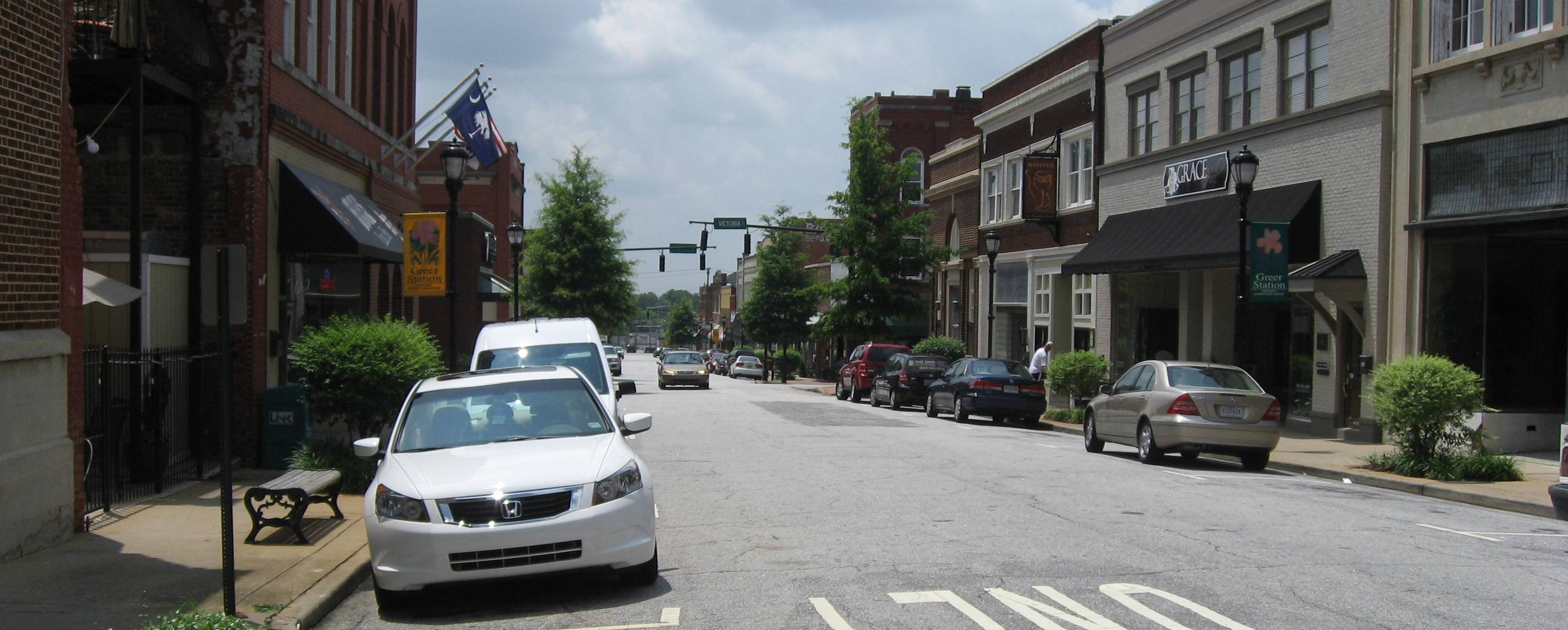
- Downtown Greer

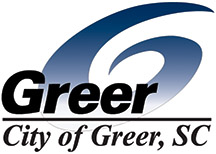
- Seal
- Motto(s): A Great Place to Live, Work, and Play
- Interactive map of Greer, South Carolina
- Location within South Carolina
- Coordinates: 34.9318°N 82.2291°W
- Country: United States
- State: South Carolina
- Counties: Greenville, Spartanburg
- Founded: 1876
- Incorporated: March 25, 1876
- Named for: James Manning Greer

Government
  - Type: Council–Manager
  - Mayor: Richard W. Danner
  - City Administrator: Andy Merriman
  - Councilmembers: Jay Arrowood; Karuiam Booker; Mark Hopper; Charles Lander; Wryley Bettis; Paul Lamb

Area
  - City: 26.601 sq mi (68.896 km^{2})
  - Land: 24.482 sq mi (63.408 km^{2})
  - Water: 2.119 sq mi (5.488 km^{2}) 7.97%
- Elevation: 974 ft (297 m)

Population (2020)
  - City: 35,308
  - Estimate (2025): 50,007
  - Rank: US: 824th SC: 9th
  - Density: 1,442.2/sq mi (556.84/km^{2})
  - Urban: 387,271 (US: 109th)
  - Metro: 1,014,101 (US: 55th)
  - Combined: 1,659,022 (US: 38th)
- Time zone: UTC–5 (Eastern (EST))
  - Summer (DST): UTC–4 (EDT)
- ZIP Codes: 29650, 29651, 29652
- Area codes: 864 and 821
- FIPS code: 45-30985
- GNIS feature ID: 2403758
- Highways: SC 14, US 25, US 29, I-85, SC 101, SC 253, SC 290
- Website: cityofgreer.org

Greer is a city in Greenville and Spartanburg Counties, South Carolina, United States. The population was 35,308 as of the 2020 census, and was estimated at 50,007 in 2025, making it the ninth-most populous city in South Carolina. Greer is included in the Greenville-Anderson-Greer, SC Metropolitan Statistical Area, which is part of the Greenville-Spartanburg-Anderson, SC Combined Statistical Area in Upstate South Carolina.

== History ==
Greer was named for James Manning Greer, who was Scottish. Many of his descendants still reside in the region. James Manning Greer was a descendant of John Greer Sr., who surveyed his land in Laurens County in 1750. John and his family were already in Laurens County, prior to the Greer passengers who arrived aboard the ship The Falls in 1764. John, Sr.'s great-grandson, James Manning Greer, settled his family near Greenville in an area that eventually became known as Greer's Station.

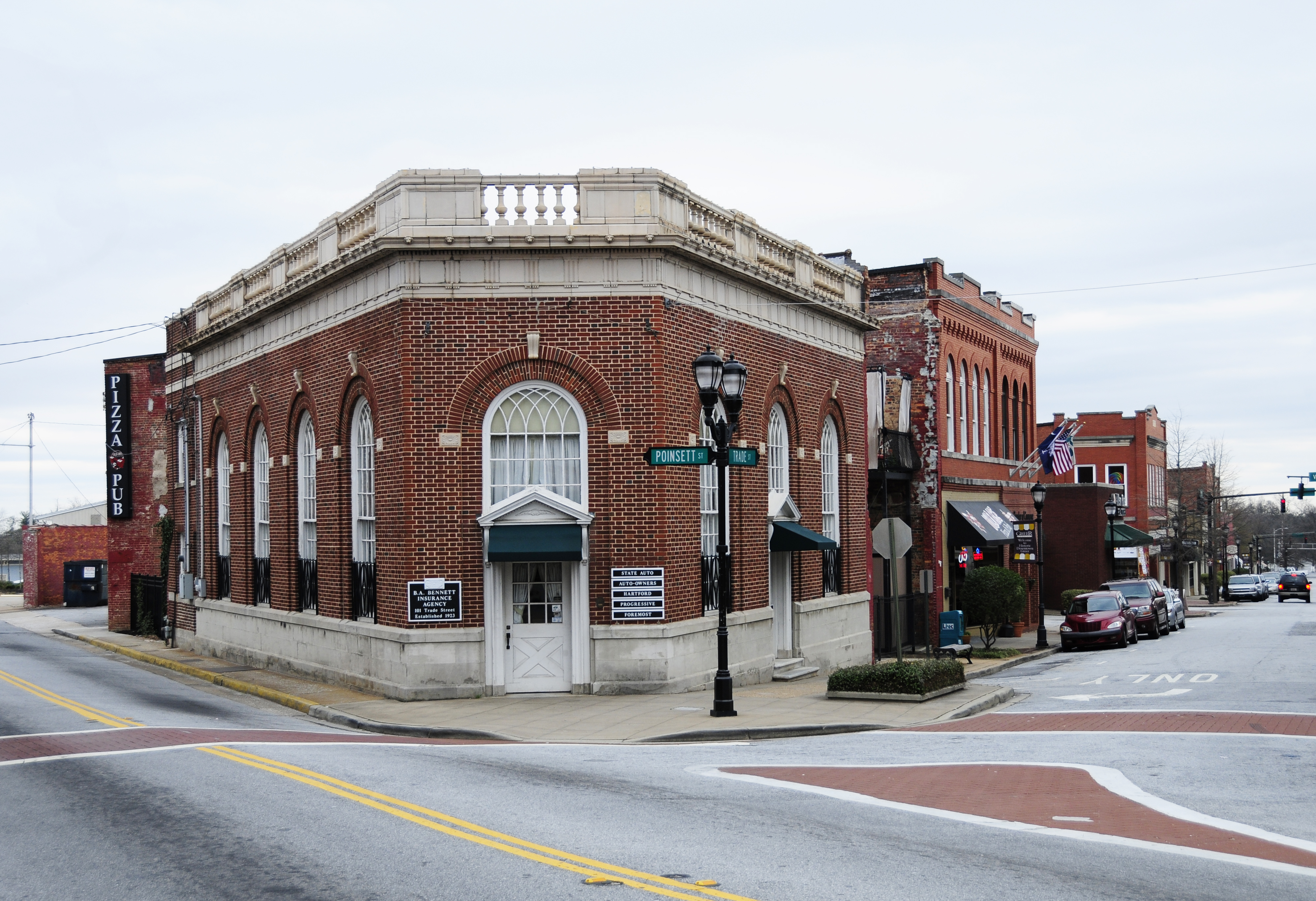
Greer Downtown Historic District

The area now known as Greer was once part of the "Domain of the Cherokees" prior to the American Revolutionary War. In 1777, the area was added to the state of South Carolina. Development toward the birth of the town occurred in 1873, when the Richmond and Danville Air Line Railway (now the Norfolk Southern Railway) established a line between Atlanta and Charlotte. A station was built on land that belonged to James Manning Greer, and was named Greer's Station. The first post office was located in the new depot, Greer's Depot. That depot was a red brick, Victorian structure with a slate roof and a cupola. It was located immediately adjacent to the current Norfolk Southern rail line between Trade Street and Depot Street, facing toward Moore Street. It was demolished in 1976 by its then owner, the Southern Railway System, in order to avoid property taxes. When the town was incorporated in 1876, it was named Town of Greer's. One hundred years later, the name was officially changed to the City of Greer without an "s" on the end.

Merchants, blacksmiths and physicians set up shop in what is now the downtown area of Greer. In 1900, Greer's first bank, the Bank of Greer's, opened. The Piedmont and Northern Railway laid a second railroad line through Greer in 1914. With two active train lines, Greer became an attractive site for commerce. The railway meant big business for local farmers, enabling them to ship their crops, mainly cotton and peaches, out of state. Greer also became a textile-manufacturing center, with flourishing mills that included Victor, Franklin, Apalache and Greer Mills. The communities that grew up around the mills were as close-knit as the outlying farming communities.

In 1939, artist Winfred Walkley painted a mural, Cotton and Peach Growing, for the town's old post office as one of thirteen works commissioned by the U.S. Treasury Department's Section of Fine Arts between 1938 and 1941 for post offices and federal buildings throughout South Carolina. The building is now home to the Greer Heritage Museum.

After World War II, the city began to grow and diversify its industrial base. A new hospital and high school were built. People came to downtown Greer from Spartanburg and Greenville to shop. In the early 1960s, Interstate 85 was opened, as well as the Greenville-Spartanburg International Airport. Imports derailed the textile industry in the 1970s and threatened to turn Greer into a ghost town, but the citizens of Greer worked together to attract new industry.

== Geography ==
Greer is located 12 miles (19 km) northeast of Greenville and 17 miles (27 km) west of Spartanburg.

According to the United States Census Bureau, the city has an area of 26.601 square miles (68.90 km^{2}), of which 24.482 square miles (63.41 km^{2}) is land and 2.119 square miles (5.49 km^{2}) (7.97%) is water. Greer has three lakes: Apalache Lake, Lake Robinson, and Lake Cunningham. The South Tyger River runs through the northern part of Greer, part of the Broad River watershed.

=== Climate ===
Climate data for Greer, South Carolina (1991−2020 normals, extremes 1893−present)
Month	Jan	Feb	Mar	Apr	May	Jun	Jul	Aug	Sep	Oct	Nov	Dec	Year
Mean daily maximum °F (°C)	52.8 (11.6)	57.0 (13.9)	64.4 (18.0)	73.2 (22.9)	80.3 (26.8)	87.2 (30.7)	90.3 (32.4)	88.5 (31.4)	82.7 (28.2)	73.1 (22.8)	62.9 (17.2)	54.9 (12.7)	72.3 (22.4)
Daily mean °F (°C)	42.5 (5.8)	45.9 (7.7)	52.8 (11.6)	61.0 (16.1)	68.9 (20.5)	76.3 (24.6)	79.7 (26.5)	78.4 (25.8)	72.5 (22.5)	61.7 (16.5)	51.6 (10.9)	44.8 (7.1)	61.3 (16.3)
Mean daily minimum °F (°C)	32.1 (0.1)	34.8 (1.6)	41.2 (5.1)	48.7 (9.3)	57.5 (14.2)	65.5 (18.6)	69.2 (20.7)	68.3 (20.2)	62.4 (16.9)	50.4 (10.2)	40.4 (4.7)	34.8 (1.6)	50.4 (10.2)
Average precipitation inches (mm)	4.12 (105)	3.84 (98)	4.48 (114)	4.04 (103)	4.07 (103)	3.90 (99)	4.82 (122)	4.66 (118)	3.73 (95)	3.59 (91)	3.84 (98)	4.58 (116)	49.57 (1,259)
Average snowfall inches (cm)	1.6 (4.1)	1.0 (2.5)	0.6 (1.5)	0.0 (0.0)	0.0 (0.0)	0.0 (0.0)	0.0 (0.0)	0.0 (0.0)	0.0 (0.0)	0.0 (0.0)	0.1 (0.25)	0.6 (1.5)	3.9 (9.9)
Average precipitation days (≥ 0.01 in)	10.4	9.4	10.2	9.7	9.7	10.8	12.0	11.1	8.0	7.1	8.5	10.0	116.9
Average snowy days (≥ 0.01 in)	1.1	0.7	0.3	0.0	0.0	0.0	0.0	0.0	0.0	0.0	0.1	0.4	2.6
Source 1: National Oceanic and Atmospheric Administration
Source 2: National Centers for Environmental Information

== Demographics ==
Historical population
Census	Pop.	Note	%±
1880	97		—
1890	320		229.9%
1900	648		102.5%
1910	1,673		158.2%
1920	2,292		37.0%
1930	2,419		5.5%
1940	2,940		21.5%
1950	5,050		71.8%
1960	8,967		77.6%
1970	10,642		18.7%
1980	10,525		−1.1%
1990	10,322		−1.9%
2000	16,843		63.2%
2010	25,515		51.5%
2020	35,308		38.4%
2025 (est.)	50,007		41.6%
U.S. Decennial Census; 2020 Census

According to realtor website Zillow, the average price of a home as of September 30, 2026, in Greer was $349,020.

As of the 2024 American Community Survey, there were 16,285 estimated households in Greer with an average of 2.53 persons per household. The city has a median household income of $82,626. Approximately 10.1% of the city's population lives at or below the poverty line. Greer has an estimated 67.8% employment rate, with 41.4% of the population holding a bachelor's degree or higher and 91.0% holding a high school diploma. There were 17,551 housing units at an average density of 716.89 per square mile (276.79/km^{2}).

The top five reported languages (people were allowed to report up to two languages, thus the figures will generally add to more than 100%) were English (81.9%), Spanish (11.6%), Indo-European (2.7%), Asian and Pacific Islander (3.3%), and Other (0.5%).

The median age in the city was 36.0 years.

Greer, South Carolina – racial and ethnic composition Note: the US Census treats Hispanic/Latino as an ethnic category. This table excludes Latinos from the racial categories and assigns them to a separate category. Hispanics/Latinos may be of any race.
Race / ethnicity (NH = non-Hispanic)	Pop. 1990	Pop. 2000	Pop. 2010	Pop. 2020	% 1990	% 2000	% 2010	% 2020
White alone (NH)	7,474	11,809	16,428	20,627	72.41%	70.11%	64.39%	58.42%
Black or African American alone (NH)	2,728	3,269	4,339	5,524	26.43%	19.41%	17.01%	15.65%
Native American or Alaska Native alone (NH)	23	28	41	60	0.22%	0.17%	0.16%	0.17%
Asian alone (NH)	15	191	565	1,868	0.15%	1.13%	2.21%	5.29%
Pacific Islander alone (NH)	—	7	11	13	—	0.04%	0.04%	0.04%
Other race alone (NH)	2	15	60	164	0.02%	0.09%	0.24%	0.46%
Mixed race or multiracial (NH)	—	147	384	1,422	—	0.87%	1.50%	4.03%
Hispanic or Latino (any race)	80	1,377	3,687	5,630	0.78%	8.18%	14.45%	15.95%
Total	10,322	16,843	25,515	35,308	100.00%	100.00%	100.00%	100.00%

=== 2020 census ===
As of the 2020 census, there were 35,308 people, 13,857 households, and 9,277 families residing in the city. The population density was 1,541.36 inhabitants per square mile (595.12/km^{2}). There were 14,942 housing units at an average density of 652.29 per square mile (251.85/km^{2}). The racial makeup of the city was 60.89% White, 15.97% African American, 0.51% Native American, 5.32% Asian, 0.04% Pacific Islander, 8.23% from some other races and 9.05% from two or more races. Hispanic or Latino people of any race were 15.95% of the population.

=== 2010 census ===
As of the 2010 census, there were 25,515 people, 10,012 households, and 6,685 families residing in the city. The population density was 1,236.37 inhabitants per square mile (477.37/km^{2}). There were 11,127 housing units at an average density of 539.18 per square mile (208.18/km^{2}). The racial makeup of the city was 70.83% White, 17.26% African American, 0.26% Native American, 2.23% Asian, 0.05% Pacific Islander, 7.24% from some other races and 2.12% from two or more races. Hispanic or Latino people of any race were 14.45% of the population.

=== 2000 census ===
As of the 2000 census, there were 16,843 people, 6,714 households, and 4,511 families residing in the city. The population density was 1,044.47 inhabitants per square mile (403.27/km^{2}). There were 7,386 housing units at an average density of 458.02 per square mile (176.84/km^{2}). The racial makeup of the city was 73.39% White, 19.49% African American, 0.22% Native American, 1.16% Asian, 0.06% Pacific Islander, 4.42% from some other races and 1.26% from two or more races. Hispanic or Latino people of any race were 8.18% of the population.

21.6% were of American, 9.5% Irish, 8.9% German and 8.4% English ancestry. 90.6% spoke English and 8.5% Spanish as their first language. Since 2000, the city has seen an explosive increase in Hispanic immigration.

There were 6,714 households, out of which 31.8% had children under the age of 18 living with them, 47.1% were married couples living together, 15.7% had a female householder with no husband present, and 32.8% were non-families. 27.9% of all households were made up of individuals, and 12.1% had someone living alone who was 65 years of age or older. The average household size was 2.47 and the average family size was 2.99.

In the city, the population was spread out, with 24.8% under the age of 18, 9.2% from 18 to 24, 33.4% from 25 to 44, 18.9% from 45 to 64, and 13.6% who were 65 years of age or older. The median age was 34 years. For every 100 females, there were 90.6 males. For every 100 females age 18 and over, there were 87.6 males.

The median income for a household in the city was $33,140, and the median income for a family was $41,864. Males had a median income of $33,147 versus $23,566 for females. The per capita income for the city was $17,546. About 12.2% of families and 15.8% of the population were below the poverty line, including 19.5% of those under age 18 and 15.1% of those age 65 or over.

== Economy ==
Greer is adjacent to Greenville-Spartanburg International Airport (GSP), which serves Greenville, Spartanburg, and Upstate South Carolina. Greer is also the site of the largest BMW manufacturing facility in North America. According to a June 2005 article in The Greenville News, BMW's Greer plant employs about 9,000 people, and has attracted dozens of suppliers in South Carolina, providing jobs for more than 12,000 people. Greer is home to the South Carolina Inland Port, an intermodal facility that receives and sends containers by rail to the Port of Charleston. The city is also home to the National Weather Service office that serves Upstate South Carolina, Northeastern Georgia and Southwestern North Carolina including the Charlotte Metropolitan Area.

== Arts and culture ==
Greer has a public library, a branch of the Greenville County Library System.

The Arthur Barnwell House, Davenport House, Gilreath's Mill, Greer Depot, Greer Downtown Historic District, Greer Post Office, Louie James House, R. Perry Turner House, Robert G. Turner House and Earle R. Taylor House and Peach Packing Shed are listed on the National Register of Historic Places.

== Parks and recreation ==
The Greer City Stadium is a WPA project completed in 1938; it currently seats 3,000. The stadium has hosted little league, scholastic, The American Legion World Series, and semi-professional sports.

In 2012, the Cannon Center, a former National Guard armory, became a basketball gym. The facility was originally built in 1936.

The City of Greer Municipal Complex was completed in 2008, and includes the 12-acre (4.9 ha) Greer City Park.

== Landmarks ==
- Greer City Park, a large downtown park with a playground, pavilion, sports fields, walking trails, and amphitheater.
- Greer Heritage Museum, first opened to the public in 1996 and now located in the historic 1935 Greer Post Office.
- Greer Station, a former railroad depot with space for downtown meetings and events. Surrounding brick-paved streets offer boutiques, restaurants, and entertainment sites.
- BMW Zentrum Museum, the only BMW museum in North America.
- Lake Robinson, an 800-acre (3.2 km^{2}) recreational man-made lake for boating, fishing, kayaking, and paddleboarding.

== Infrastructure ==
=== Healthcare ===
Pelham Medical Center, part of Spartanburg Regional Healthcare System, is a 48-bed hospital providing emergency services, general surgery, gynecology, orthopedics, cardiology (non-invasive), endocrinology, gastroenterology, general medicine, oncology, and intensive care services. This campus includes Pelham Medical Center Medical Office Building, the Surgery Center at Pelham, and the Gibbs Cancer Center and Research Institute at Pelham, which provides radiation oncology, medical oncology, and Cyberknife M6 surgery.

Greer Memorial Hospital is an 82-bed facility with emergency, ICU and maternity care.

=== Transportation ===
==== Airports ====
Greer is served by the Greenville–Spartanburg International Airport Roger Milliken Field, which in 2012 handled over 1.7 million passengers. The airport is a commercial Class C airport, with cargo and passenger facilities.

==== Railroads ====
Greer is served by Amtrak, the national passenger rail system, which operates to both Greenville and Spartanburg. Greer is the location of Inland Port Greer, one of two inland ports in South Carolina, built to handle containerized goods. Inland Port Greer is served by Norfolk Southern and connects Greer to the Port of Charleston.

==== Highways ====
One two-digit Interstate highway runs through Greer. Interstate 85 passes 5 miles (8 km) south of the city center, with access from Exits 57 through 60. I-85 leads northeast 90 miles (140 km) to Charlotte, North Carolina, and southwest 154 miles (248 km) to Atlanta. U.S. Route 29 runs through Greer, connecting Greenville and Spartanburg. South Carolina Highway 14 and South Carolina Highway 290 both run through Greer. SC 14 leads north 18 miles (29 km) to Landrum, near the North Carolina border, and south 16 miles (26 km) to Simpsonville, while SC 290 leads east 5 miles (8 km) to Duncan and northwest 13 miles (21 km) to U.S. Route 25 north of Travelers Rest.

== Education ==
Residents of Greenville County are in the Greenville County School District. Within Spartanburg County, portions are in the Greenville County district, while other portions are in the Spartanburg School District 5.

Greer is primarily served by two high schools. Greer High School serves Downtown Greer and the areas north of downtown whereas Riverside High School serves the majority of the remainder of Greer.

Portions of Greer are also served by Blue Ridge High School and Eastside High School, in Greenville County School District, and James F. Byrnes High School in Spartanburg School District 5.

Greer Middle College Charter High School is a charter public school in the Greater Greer area.

The Greater Greer Area High Schools in Greenville County are served by J. Harley Bonds Career Center.

== Notable people ==
- Kris Bruton, Harlem Globetrotters; 1994 NCAA college dunk champion
- Bill Haas, golfer; multiple winner on the PGA Tour and winner of the 2011 FedEx Cup
- Jay Haas, golfer; multiple winner on the PGA Tour and Champions Tour
- Kaleigh Kurtz, National Women's Soccer League player, North Carolina Courage, 2018–
- Daniel Palka, Major League Baseball Player, Chicago White Sox, 2018–2019

== See also ==
- List of municipalities in South Carolina
