= Michigan Millers Mutual Fire Insurance Company Building =

- U.S. National Register of Historic Places
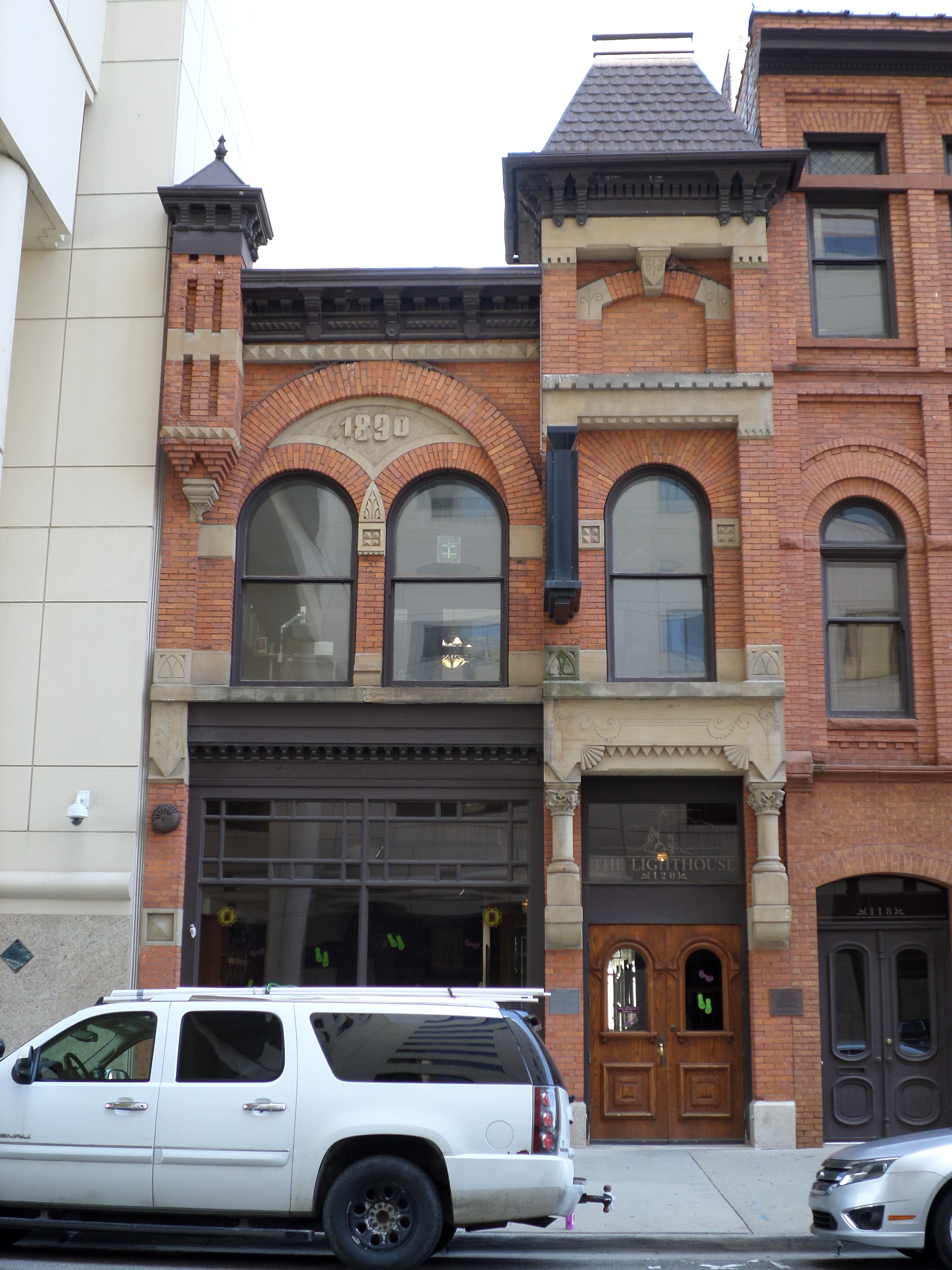
- Interactive map
- Location: 120-122 W. Ottawa St., Lansing, Michigan
- Coordinates: 42°44′05″N 84°33′12″W
- Area: less than one acre
- Built: 1890
- Architect: Darius B. Moon
- Architectural style: Richardsonian Romanesque
- MPS: Downtown Lansing MRA
- NRHP reference No.: 80001869
- Added to NRHP: September 17, 1980

The Michigan Millers Mutual Fire Insurance Company Building is a historic office block located at 120-122 West Ottawa Street in Lansing, Michigan. It was listed on the National Register of Historic Places in 1980.

== History ==
The Michigan Millers Mutual Fire Insurance Company was founded in 1881 to provide fire insurance protection for mills. In 1890, the company hired local Lansing architect Darius B. Moon to design an office building. The company occupied the building from 1890 until 1928 when they built the larger Mutual Building located nearby.

== Description ==
The Michigan Millers Mutual Fire Insurance Company Building is a two-story, narrow-fronted, Late Victorian commercial block with Richardsonian Romanesque detailing. It has a red brick facade with sandstone trim, and a projecting tower supported by stubby Romanesque columns. The first floor storefront was altered over the years, but in 1978 was redesigned to match the building facade, containing paneled doors and a Queen Anne window treatment. On the second floor, a pair of round-headed windows in a brick frame. A metal bracketed cornice tops the building.
