= Benjamin Davis House =

- Formerly listed on the U.S. National Register of Historic Places
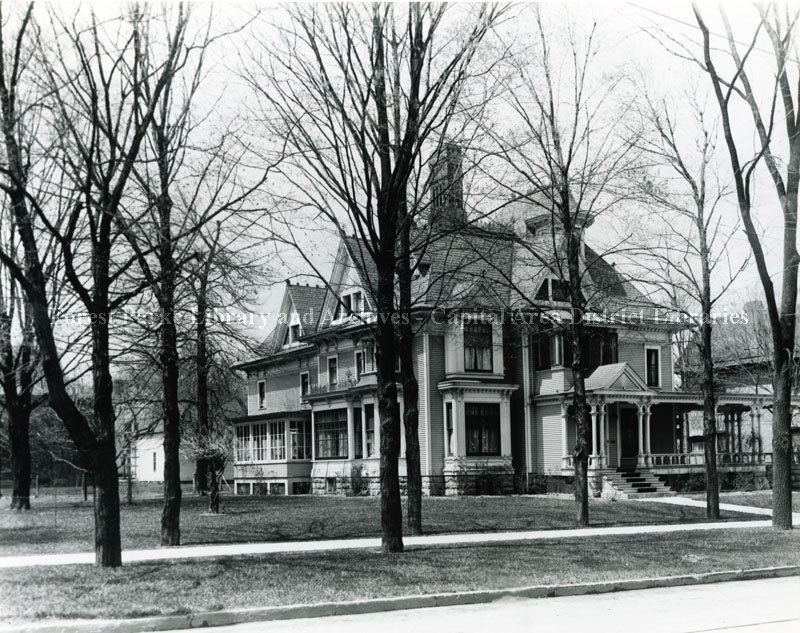
- Interactive map
- Location: 528 S. Washington Ave., Lansing, Michigan
- Coordinates: 42°43′40″N 84°33′0″W
- Area: less than one acre
- Built: 1889
- Architect: Darius B. Moon
- Architectural style: Carpenter Gothic
- Demolished: 1972
- NRHP reference No.: 72001589

Significant dates
- Added to NRHP: 1971
- Removed from NRHP: 1972

The Benjamin Davis House was a historic house located at 528 South Washington Avenue Lansing, Michigan, USA. It was formerly listed on the National Register of Historic Places, but was demolished and delisted in 1972.

Benjamin F. Davis was born in 1844 in Elba, New York, the son of William and Mary Davis. His family moved to Michigan in 1851. He attended the Michigan Agricultural College for a time, and in 1862 began work for the Quartermaster Corps in Washington, D.C., a position he held until 1867. He returned to Lansing and engaged in different businesses. In 1875, Davis married Eva D. Sparrow; the couple eventually had two daughters. Davis founded the Lansing Company, a maker of wheelbarrows, in 1881 and the City National Bank in 1886. Both ventures prospered, making Davis a wealthy man.

In 1889, Davis commissioned local architect Darius B. Moon to design a house for them. Moon's design was a fine Victorian Carpenter Gothic, with multiple porches and balconies. A Chinese pagoda was placed on the roof, with a wide veranda and a porte-cochère below. Davis's wife Eva died in 1890, but Davis lived in the house until his death in 1934. Davis's last surviving daughter, Mrs. Edith Eva Davis, lived in the house for a time. After her death, the house was vacant and rapidly deteriorated. In 1971, demolition began, but were temporarily halted as plans were being made to rehabilitate the house by the Greater Lansing Historical Society. However, the house soon burned and was demolished.
