= Louie James House =

Historic house in South Carolina, United States

- U.S. National Register of Historic Places
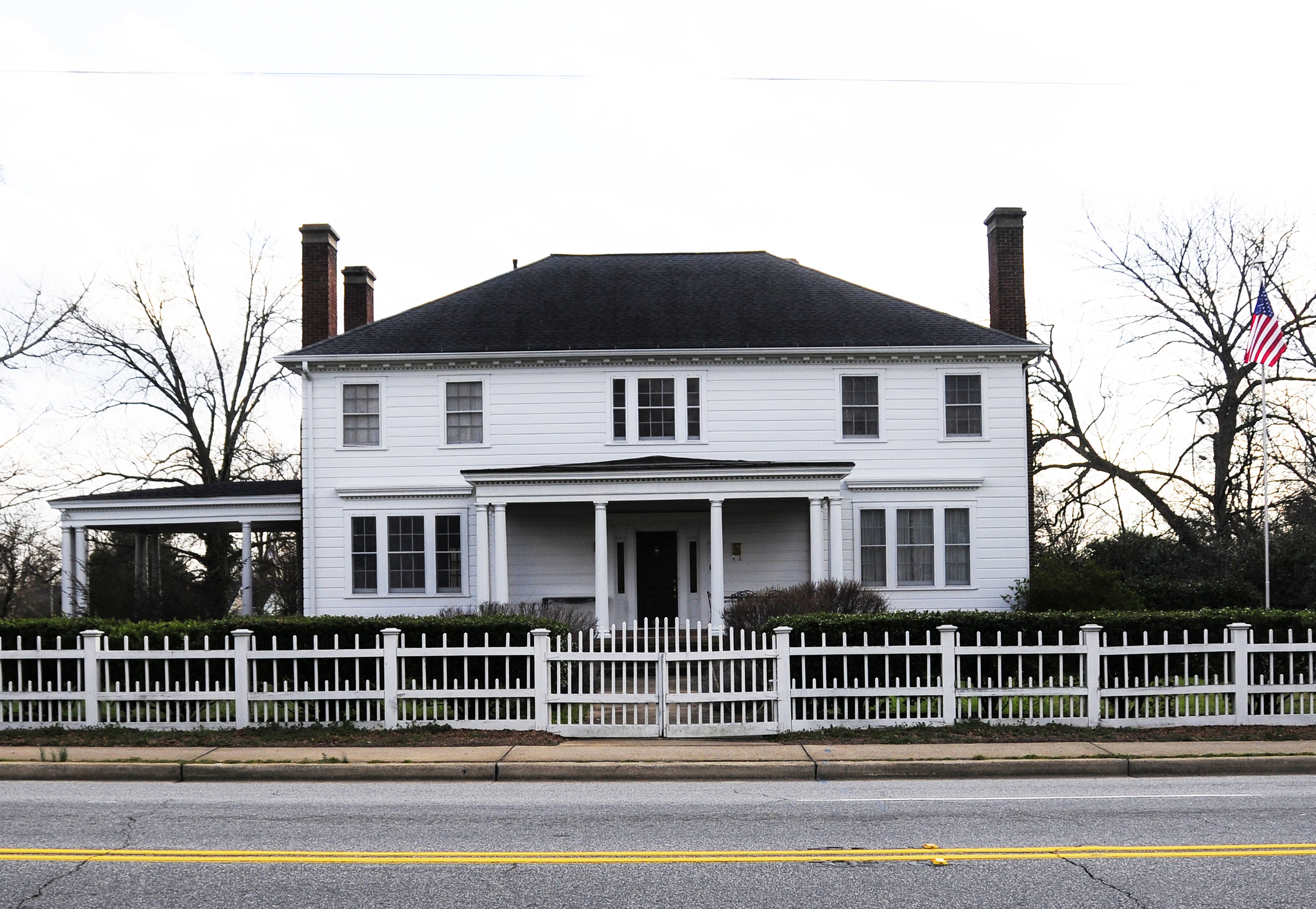
- Louie James House, 2012

- Location within South Carolina Location within the United States
- Location: 401 W. Poinsett St., Greer, South Carolina
- Coordinates: 34.9403°N 82.234107°W
- Area: 0.8 acres (0.32 ha)
- Built: 1923
- Built by: J. C. Cunningham
- Architect: Henry R. Trott
- Architectural style: Colonial Revival
- NRHP reference No.: 96000985
- Added to NRHP: September 19, 1996

The Louie James House is a property listed on the National Register of Historic Places located in Greer, South Carolina. The two-story Colonial Revival frame house on a brick basement foundation was built in 1923 for William Louis James. It was designed by the architect Henry R. Trott, from Greenville, South Carolina based architectural firm Jones and Trott.

The L-shaped house features 5 chimneys and has a Roman Doric style porch with a terra cotta-tiled terrace along the entire width of the house. Interior features include Roman Doric columns, decorative mouldings, pilasters and an arched vestibule. The majority of the interior light fixtures are original to the house.
