= Greer Post Office =

- U.S. National Register of Historic Places
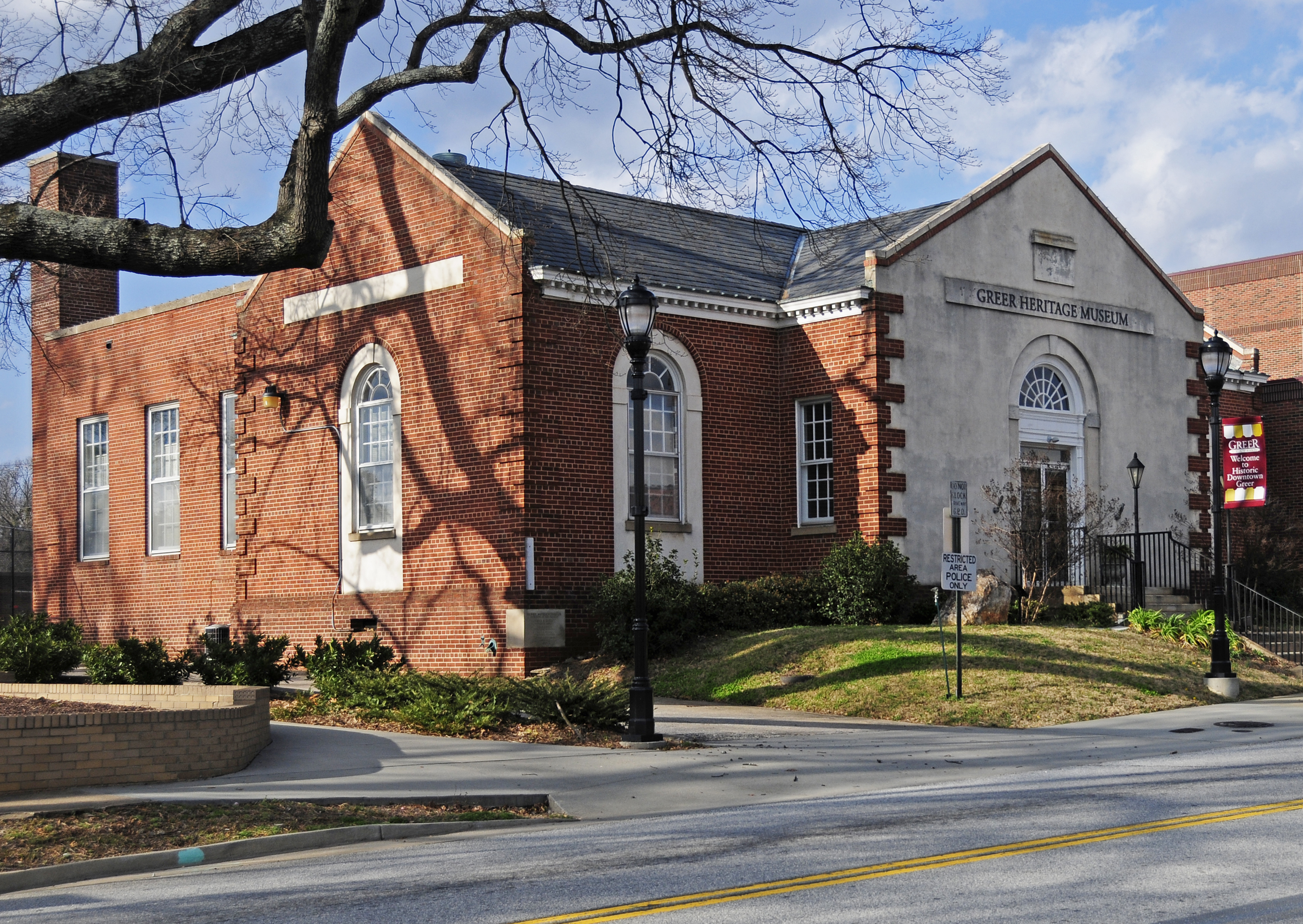
- Greer Post Office building, 2012

- Location within South Carolina Location within the United States
- Location: 106 South Main Street, Greer, South Carolina
- Coordinates: 34.9382°N 82.2281°W
- Built: 1935
- Built by: Lloyd B. Gallimore
- Architect: Donald G. Anderson
- Architectural style: Colonial Revival
- NRHP reference No.: 10001184
- Added to NRHP: January 31, 2011

The Greer Post Office is a historic building and former United States post office in Greer, South Carolina, listed on the National Register of Historic Places. The Colonial Revival–style post office was constructed in 1935 under the supervision of the Public Works Administration during the New Deal era and designed by New York City–based architect Donald G. Anderson, with Louis A. Simon named as supervising architect. Unlike this post office, most New Deal era buildings were designed by in-house architects.

The building lobby features a post office mural, Cotton and Peach Growing, painted in 1940 by Winfield Walkley. Although the mural was roughly handled and covered with paneling when the post office became the Greer city hall in 1968, the paneling was removed in 2008 following acquisition of the property by the museum. The mural is one of 13 commissioned between 1938 and 1941 by the Treasury Section of Fine Arts for South Carolina federal buildings and post offices. In 1964, the building was sold to the city of Greer for use as a city hall.
