= Darius B. Moon House =

- U.S. National Register of Historic Places
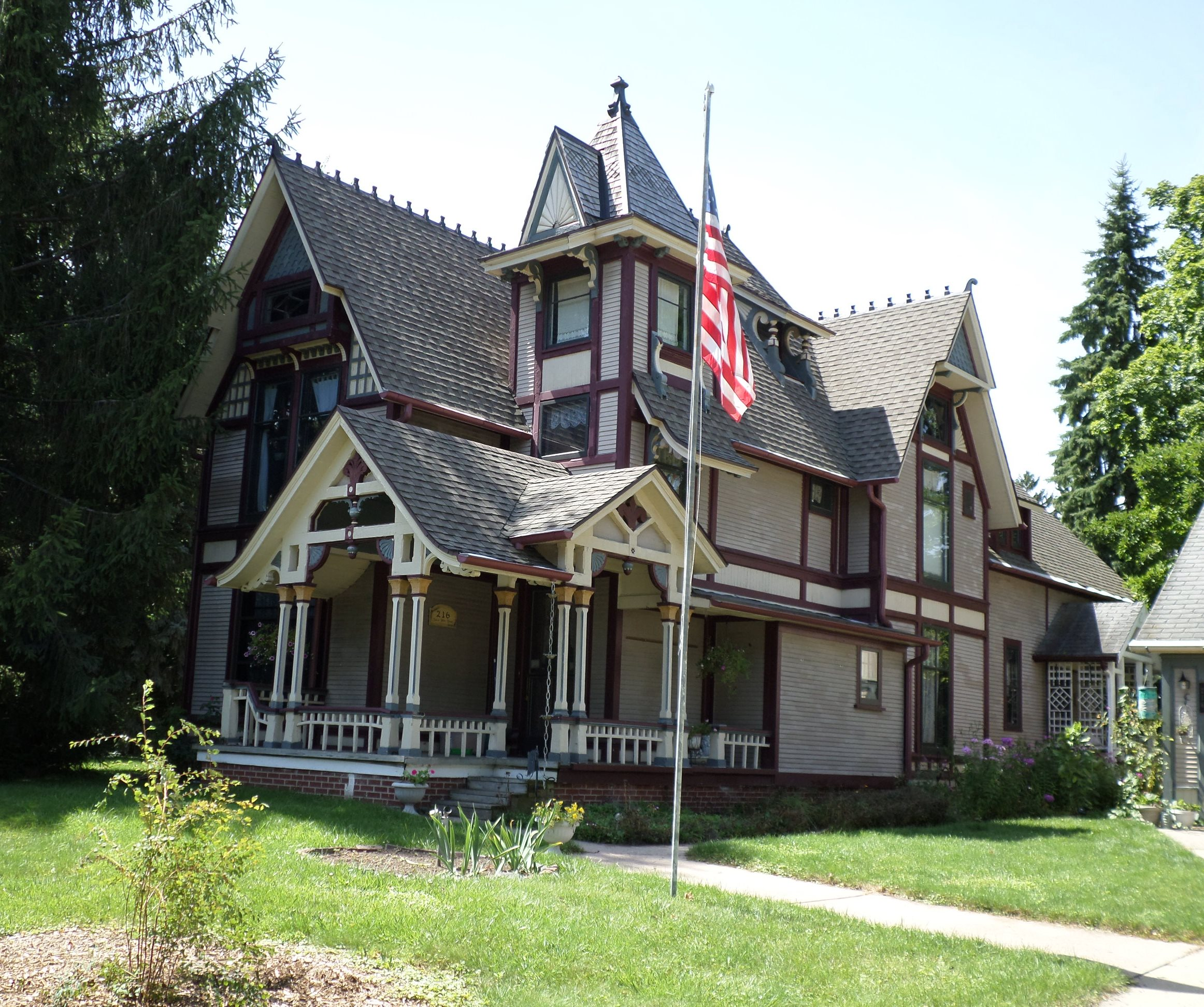
- Interactive map
- Location: 216 Huron St., Lansing, Michigan
- Coordinates: 42°43′54″N 84°34′19″W
- Area: less than one acre
- Built: 1894
- Architect: Darius B. Moon
- Architectural style: Queen Anne
- NRHP reference No.: 82000535
- Added to NRHP: November 30, 1982

The Darius B. Moon House is a private home constructed by architect Darius B. Moon for his own use. It is located at 216 Huron Street in Lansing, Michigan. The house was listed on the National Register of Historic Places in 1982.

== History ==
Darius B. Moon was born in 1851 in Cattaraugus County, New York, and moved to Eaton County, Michigan when he was three years old. He was married in 1877 and moved to Lansing by 1883 and began his career as a builder. He was interested in architecture from an early age, and was likely self-taught. Following his interest, by 1888 he was working as an architect.

In 1894, Moon designed this Queen Anne house, then located at 112 Logan Street, for his own residence. He lived there until his retirement in 1923, at which time he converted the second floor into an apartment. Moon lived in the apartment, while his daughter Princess and her husband, Howard Adams, occupied the downstairs apartment. Moon lived in the house until his death in 1934, and his daughter lived there through the mld-1950s.

In the 1970s there was a fire on the second floor, and the house was abandoned. In 1975, a local non-profit, Save the Moon House, Inc., purchased the house and in 1978 moved it to its present location. The house was sold to a private owner, and rehabilitated by 1979.

== Description ==
The Darius B. Moon House Is a two-and-one-half-story, Queen Anne-style house with a cross-gable-and-hip roof topped with a prominent three-story, square tower. Ornamental tin cresting runs along the roof ridge, and a tin finial is located at the peak of the tower. A single-story porch is located on one side. At the rear is a single-story 1904 addition, and a second 1978 addition constructed after the house was moved. The exterior walls of the house are divided into panels with horizontal and vertical half-timbering, with clapboard in between. The gables are shingled.

On the interior, the first floor contains an entrance hall leading to a staircase, along with a small parlor, living room, a long narrow dining room, a half-bath and an office. The rear addition houses the kitchen and breakfast area. The second floor contains three bedrooms and two bathrooms.
