= Turner-Ledbetter House =

Historic house in Arkansas, United States

- U.S. National Register of Historic Places
- U.S. Historic district – Contributing property
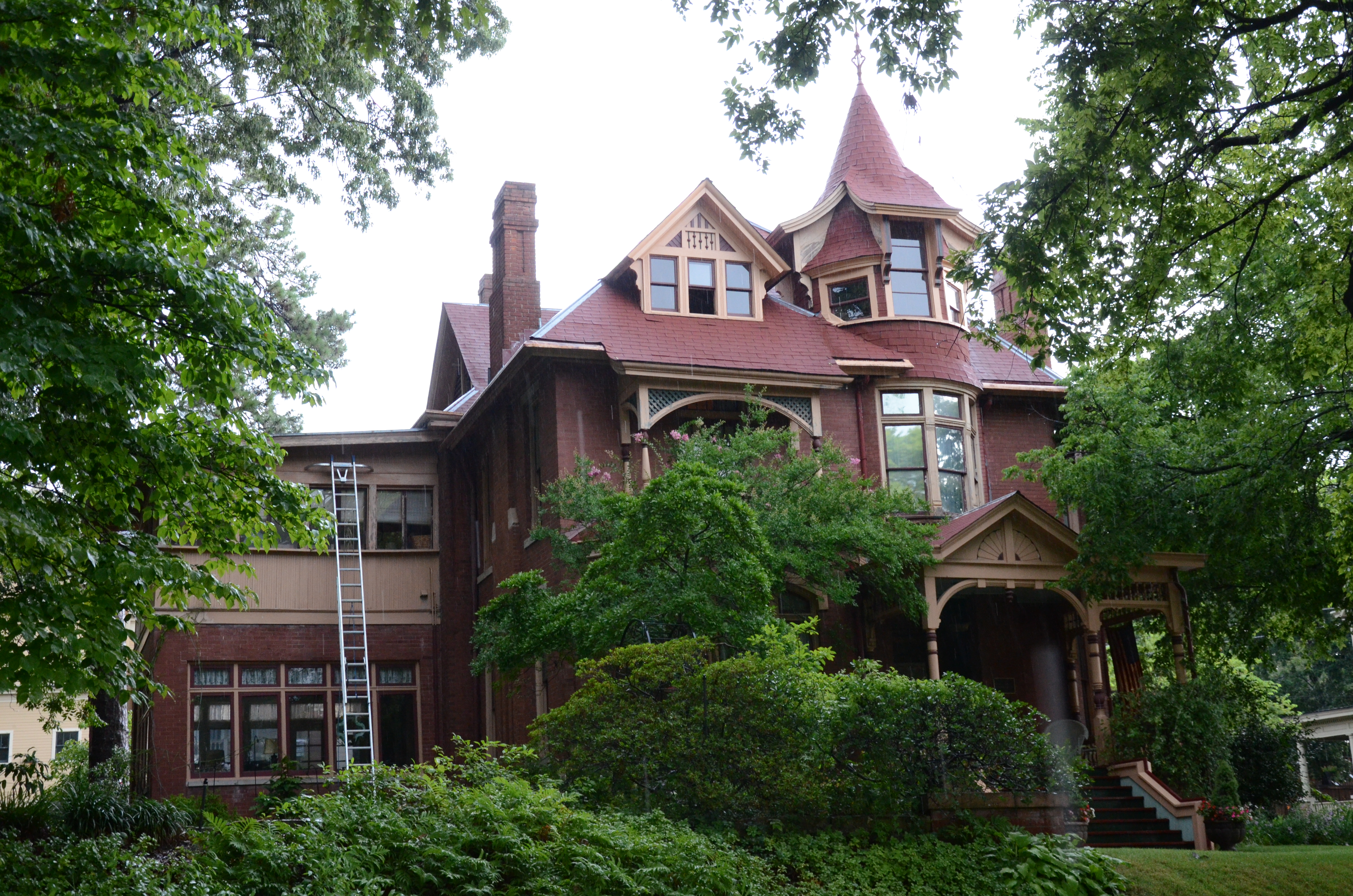

- Location within Arkansas Location within the United States
- Location: 1700 S. Louisiana St., Little Rock, Arkansas
- Coordinates: 34°43′57″N 92°16′29″W
- Area: less than one acre
- Built: 1891
- Architectural style: Queen Anne
- Part of: Governor's Mansion Historic District (ID78000620)
- NRHP reference No.: 87000978

Significant dates
- Added to NRHP: June 18, 1987
- Designated CP: September 13, 1978

The Turner-Ledbetter House is a historic house at 1700 South Louisiana Street in Little Rock, Arkansas. It is a two-story wood-frame structure, its exterior mostly finished in brick, with a hip roof and a variety of dormers, projections, porches, and decorative elements typical of the Queen Anne period of architecture. Notable features include a three-story turret with flared conical roof, an entry porch with turned posts, bracketing, and a spindled balustrade, and windows with stone sills. The house was built in 1891-92 for Susan Turner, and was given additional Craftsman styling during renovations in the early decades of the 20th century.

The house was listed on the National Register of Historic Places in 1987.

== See also ==
- National Register of Historic Places listings in Little Rock, Arkansas
