= Turner House (Little Rock, Arkansas) =

American historic house

- U.S. National Register of Historic Places
- U.S. Historic district – Contributing property
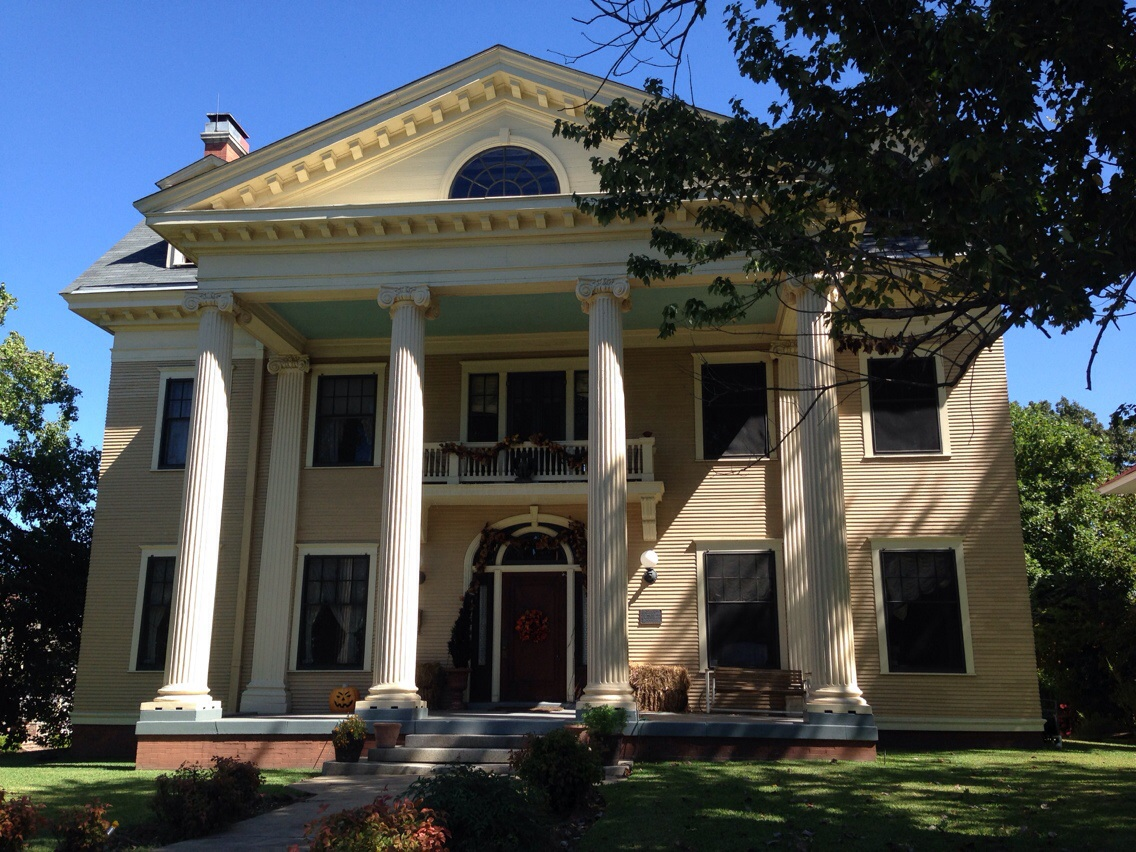

- Location within Arkansas Location within the United States
- Location: 1701 Center St., Little Rock, Arkansas
- Coordinates: 34°43′56″N 92°16′31″W
- Area: less than one acre
- Built: 1904
- Architect: Charles L. Thompson
- Architectural style: Colonial Revival
- Part of: Governor's Mansion Historic District (ID78000620)
- MPS: Thompson, Charles L., Design Collection TR
- NRHP reference No.: 82000932

Significant dates
- Added to NRHP: December 22, 1982
- Designated CP: September 13, 1978

The Turner House, also known as the Turner-Fulk House, is a historic house at 1701 Center Street in Little Rock, Arkansas. It is a two-story wood-frame structure, with a gabled roof, clapboarded exterior, and brick foundation. Its most prominent feature is a massive two-story temple portico, with a fully pedimented and modillioned gabled pediment supported by fluted Ionic columns. The main entry is framed by sidelight windows and an elliptical fanlight, and there is a shallow but wide balcony above. The house was built in 1904–05 to a design by noted Arkansas architect Charles L. Thompson.

The house was listed on the National Register of Historic Places in 1982.

== See also ==
- National Register of Historic Places listings in Little Rock, Arkansas
