= Christman Building (Lansing, Michigan) =

- Mutual Building
- U.S. National Register of Historic Places
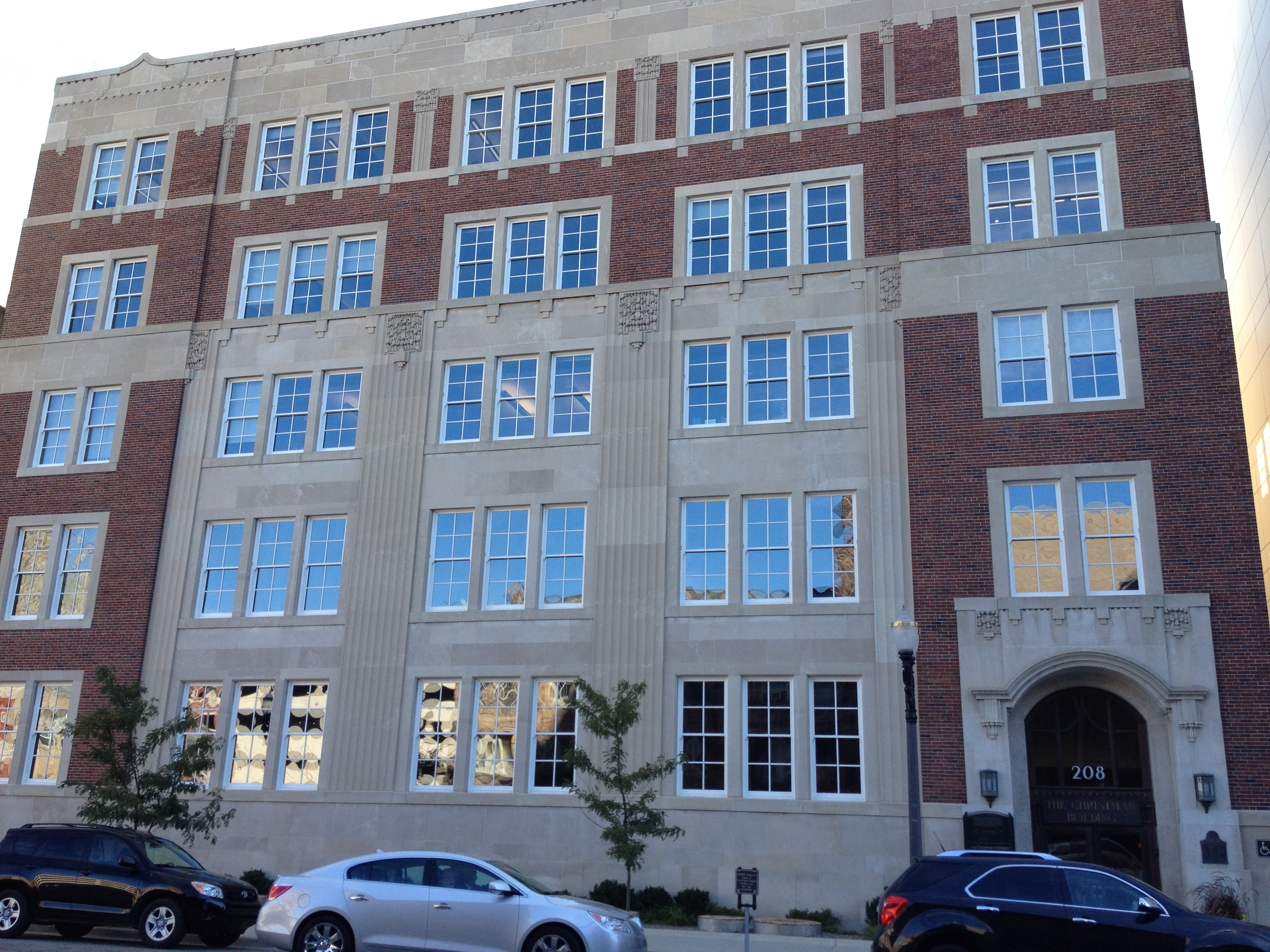
- Interactive map
- Location: 208 N. Capitol Ave., Lansing, Michigan
- Coordinates: 42°44′07″N 84°33′13″W
- Area: less than one acre
- Built: 1928
- Architect: Pond & Pond, Martin & Lloyd
- Architectural style: Tudor Revival, Elizabethan Revival
- MPS: Downtown Lansing MRA
- NRHP reference No.: 80001870
- Added to NRHP: September 17, 1980

The Christman Building is an office building located at 208 North Capitol Avenue in Lansing, Michigan. It was listed on the National Register of Historic Places in 1980.

== History ==
The Christman Building was built as the "Mutual Building" for Michigan Millers Mutual Fire Insurance Company in 1928. Millers Mutual was founded in 1881 to provide fire insurance protection for mills. Their offices were located in the nearby Michigan Millers Mutual Fire Insurance Company Building from 1890 until 1928. In that year, Millers Mutual hired the Chicago architectural firm of Pond & Pond, Martin & Lloyd to design a new, larger building. The company used the building until 1957. The building remained vacant until 1962, when the Michigan Historical Museum moved in, occupying the first three floors. In the early 1990s, the museum relocated. By 2007, the building was vacant, and The Christman Company redeveloped and completely renovated the building for use as an office building, and rededicated it as the Christman Building. In 2010, the Christman Building became the world’s first "triple-Platinum" LEED project after earning certifications in their core & shell, commercial interiors, and operations & maintenance programs.

== Description ==
The Mutual Building is a five-story, red brick office building trimmed with limestone. The facade is a stylized version of Elizabethan architecture. It is five bays wide with the end bays projecting slightly forward. The windows in the front are double-hung, wooden-sash units placed in three-window units in the center section and two-window units in the end bays. A recessed, segmental-arch-headed entrance is located at the right-hand end of the facade. At the time of construction, grindstones from seven Michigan mills were embedded in the sidewalk, symbolizing the origin of the company. After rehabilitation, the grindstones were replaced in front of the building. These grindstones and mills are identified in a bronze plaque set into the wall near entrance.

A non-historic, two-story garage and former printing plant was located at the rear of the building.
