= Smith–Turner House =

Historic house in Michigan, United States

- U.S. National Register of Historic Places
- Michigan State Historic Site
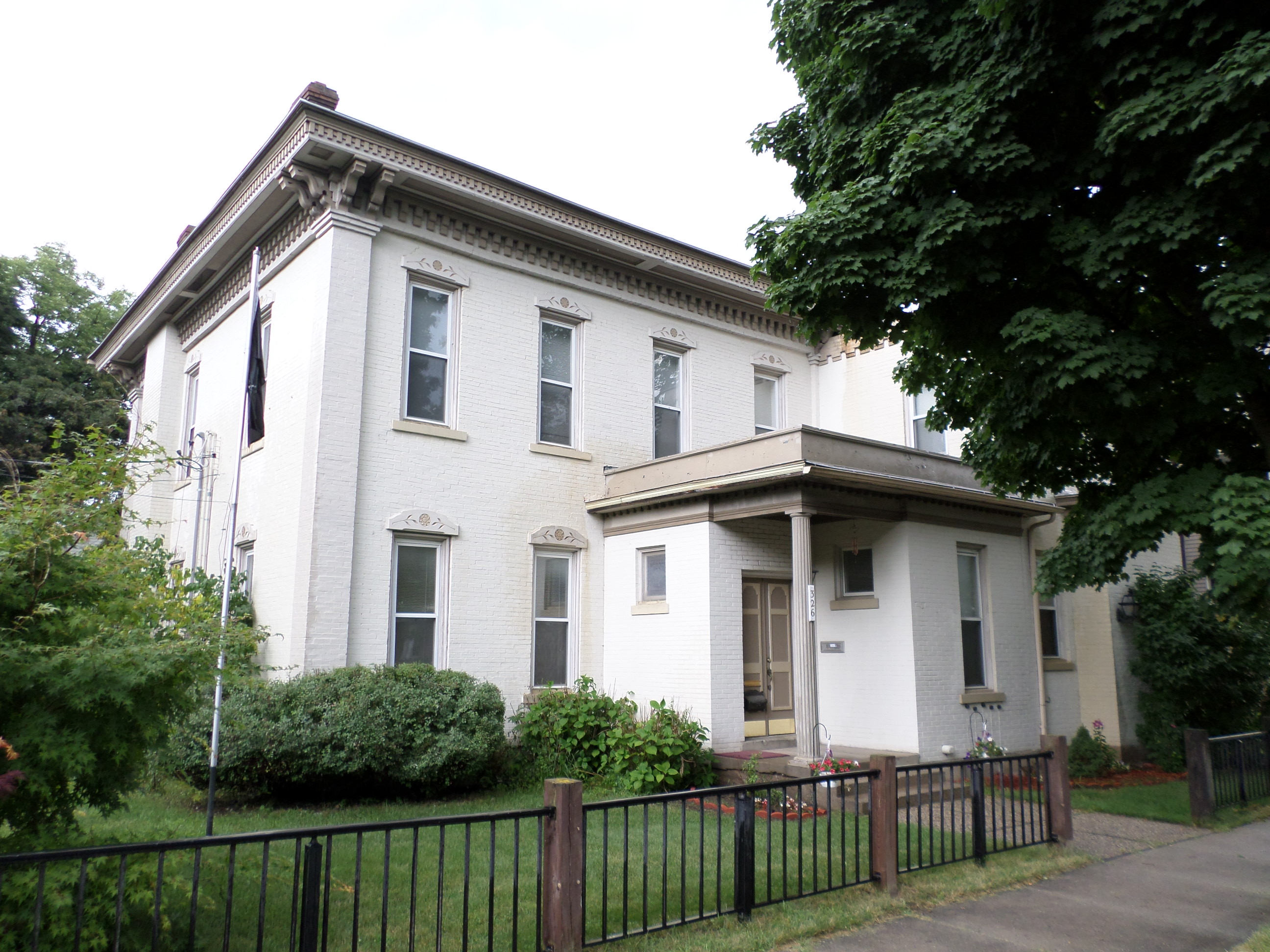
- The Smith–Turner House in July 2014

- Location within Michigan Location within the United States
- Interactive map
- Location: 326 W. Grand River Ave., Lansing, Michigan
- Coordinates: 42°44′51″N 84°33′24″W
- Area: 1 acre (0.40 ha)
- Built: 1873
- Architectural style: Italianate, Queen Anne
- NRHP reference No.: 80004604

Significant dates
- Added to NRHP: July 11, 1980
- Designated MSHS: April 15, 1977

The Smith–Turner House is an Italianate and Queen Anne-styled house located at 326 West Grand River Avenue in Lansing, Michigan. It was listed on the National Register of Historic Places in 1980.

== History ==
The Smith–Turner House was constructed in approximately 1873 for Samuel C. Smith, a part owner of a North Lansing drug store. In 1878, the house was purchased by James M. Turner, one of Lansing's most prominent businessmen at the time. Turner was born in Lansing in 1850 and married Sophia Porter Scott in 1876. He became rich in the 1870s, speculating on timber and mining lands in the northern part of Michigan, helped organize the Chicago and Northeastern Railroad, and served a term in the state legislature. Turner added a small wing to the house in 1888. He lived in this house until his death in 1896.

In 1919, the Wilde Conservatory of Music was founded by Hans Wilde. Wilde constructed a large addition to the house as a space for music rooms and a small auditorium. The Conservatory used this house for sixty years.

== Description ==
The Smith–Turner House is a two-story, brick Italianate structure with a hip roof and a rear ell. The 1919–21 addition is Queen Anne in style, and is located at one corner of the house. The addition and adds 1200 square feet to the house. Much of the original exterior detaining remains on the house, including the bracketed and dentiled cornices, corner pilasters, and carved stone window caps. However, the original front veranda was replaced in about 1900 by a Colonial Revival door porch, which was converted to a small porch/vestibule during the 1919-21 renovation.

== See also ==
- Turner-Dodge House, also known as Dodge Mansion, also NRHP-listed in Lansing
