= Turner-Dodge House =

- U.S. National Register of Historic Places
- Michigan State Historic Site
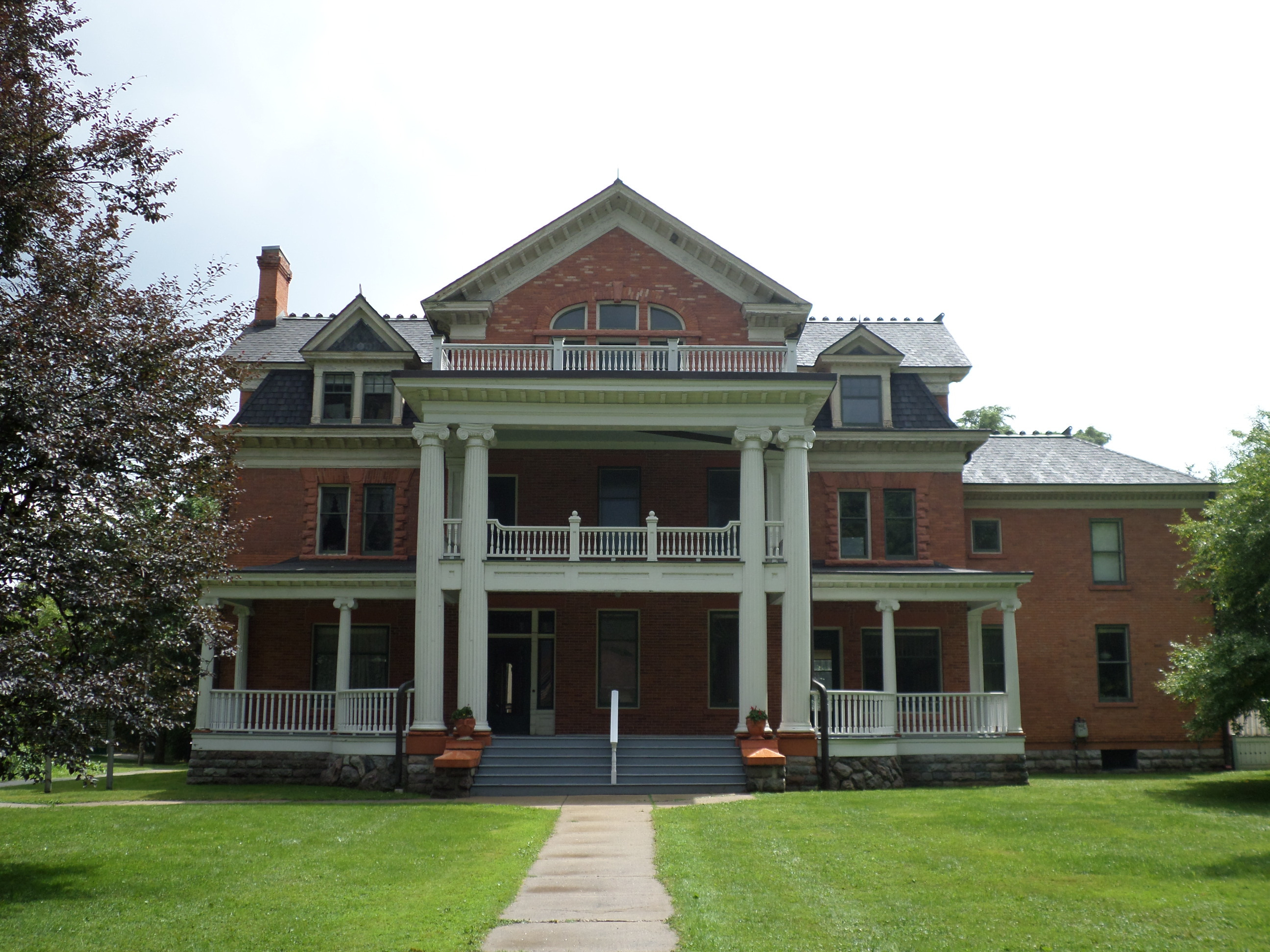
- The Turner-Dodge House in July 2014

- Location within Michigan Location within the United States
- Interactive map
- Location: 106 E. North St., Lansing, Michigan
- Coordinates: 42°45′3″N 84°33′8″W
- Area: 9 acres (3.6 ha)
- Built: Construction began in 1855; completed in 1858. Renovations began around 1900 and were finished by 1903.
- Architect: Darius B. Moon
- Architectural style: Late 19th and 20th Century Revivals, Georgian Revival, Greek Revival
- NRHP reference No.: 72000621

Significant dates
- Added to NRHP: September 14, 1972
- Designated MSHS: May 17, 1973

The Turner-Dodge House is a historic house in Lansing, Michigan that was built in 1855. It was listed on the National Register of Historic Places (NRHP) in 1972 as Dodge Mansion.

The Turner-Dodge House is now a museum and historical center dedicated to Lansing's early pioneers. The house sits in the Classical Revival-styled Turner-Dodge Mansion, built in 1858 for James and Marion Turner, and later expanded by their daughter Abigail Turner-Dodge and her husband Frank Dodge at the turn of the century.

== History ==
In 1847, the state legislature established a new capitol at the then substantially unsettled Lansing location. Merchant James Turner moved from Mason to the new settlement, selecting a home site at this location. In the 1850s, Turner built a large mansion on his property. He lived there until his death in 1869, after which his widow remained in the house. Ownership of the house passed to his son James Munroe Turner, who lived there until his death. After this, James M's sister, Abbey, and her husband Frank Dodge purchased the house. Abbey and Frank lived there with their children, including Franklin Dodge Jr., a Bureau of Investigation agent who became embroiled in controversy in the 1920s after his affair with George Remus's wife Imogene.

In 1900, the Dodges hired Lansing architect Darius B. Moon to modernize and renovate the house. The project was completed in 1903, resulting in a house with a completely changed appearance, almost entirely obliterating the design of the original house. Frank Dodge died in 1929, after which his daughter Josephine (Dodge) MacLean lived in the house. The Great Lakes Bible College acquired the house in 1958, and occupied it until 1972 when it moved to another campus. The city of Lansing purchased the property in 1974. In the 1990s and 2000s, substantial renovation was done to the house. The house is open as a historical site, heritage center, and hosts special events.

== Description ==
The Turner-Dodge House is a large Georgian Revival brick house. It has a three-story central section flanked by 2 1/2-story wings. The house has a large two-story front porch with Ionic columns, sitting on a stone foundation. The house is encircled by a massive wooden cornice. A large porte cochere is located in the rear.

On the interior, the house has large classical doorways, multiple fireplaces, and beveled and leaded glass windows.

== See also ==
- Smith–Turner House, also NRHP-listed in Lansing
