= Gilreath's Mill =

- U.S. National Register of Historic Places
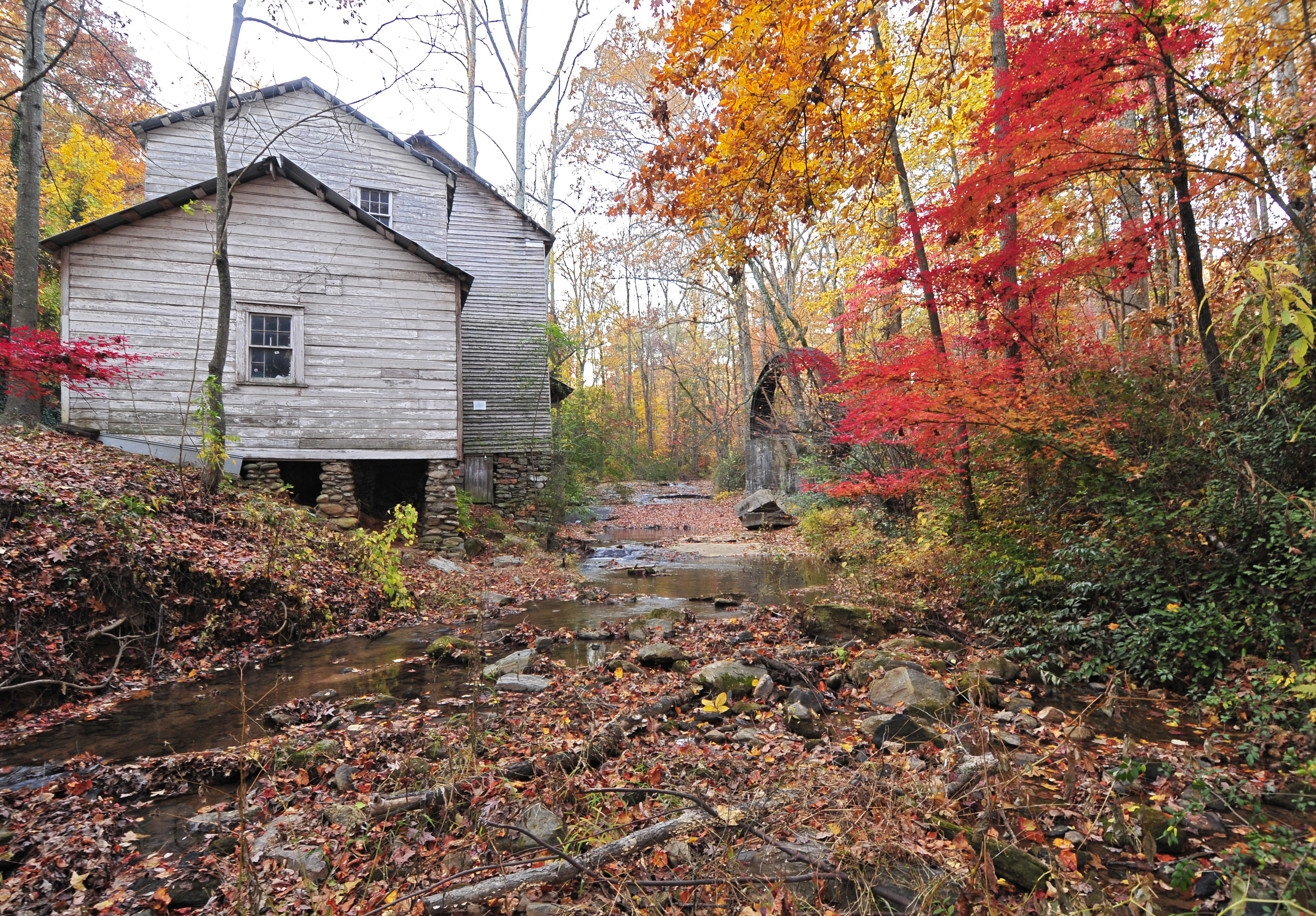
- Gilreath's Mill, 2011

- Location within South Carolina Location within the United States
- Nearest city: Greer, South Carolina
- Coordinates: 34.97307°N 82.27842°W
- Area: 5 acres (2.0 ha)
- Built: 1839
- NRHP reference No.: 76001703
- Added to NRHP: May 28, 1976

Gilreath's Mill (at times also known as Heller's Mill, Bruce's Mill, and Taylor's Mill) is located on South Carolina Highway 101, near the town of Greer, South Carolina. The 2 1/2-story mill which sits on stone pillars was likely built ca1814, however, records can only confirm its existence as far back as 1839. It is one of the few remaining original mills that once provided staple foods and provided a place for rural residents to congregate.

The building, built by Joel Bruce, includes two gable-roof sheds that were added to the north end of the original building. The water wheel, which powered the mill, is located to the southwest of the building. The mill produced both cornmeal as well as flour.
