= Darius Moon =

American architect (1851–1939)

- Darius B. Moon House
- U.S. National Register of Historic Places
- Michigan State Historic Site
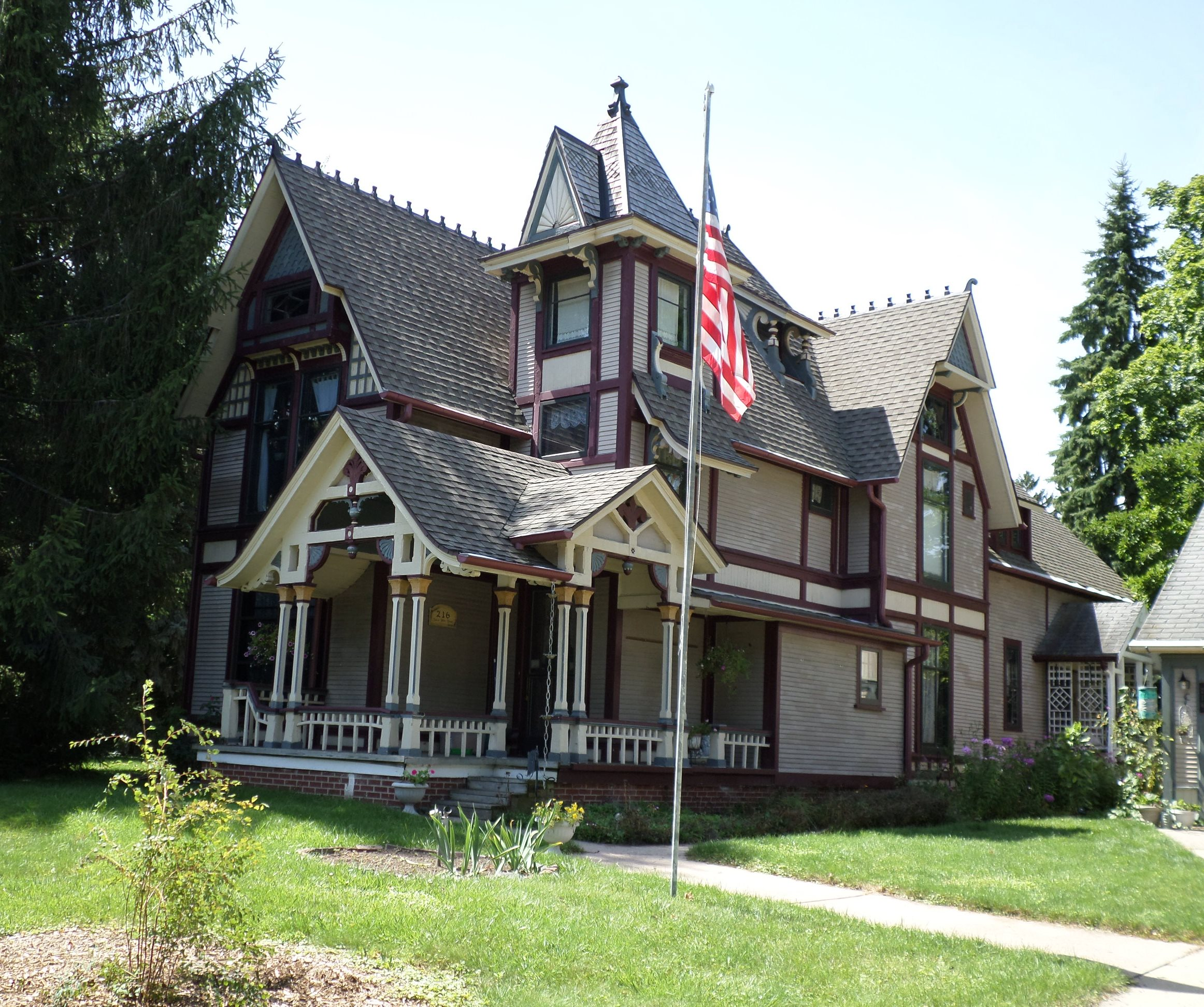
- Darius B. Moon House in Lansing, Michigan

- Location within Michigan
- Location: 216 Huron Street, Lansing, Michigan; United States
- Coordinates: 42°43′56″N 84°34′18″W
- Built: 1875
- Architect: Darius B. Moon
- Architectural style: Queen Anne
- NRHP reference No.: 82000535
- Added to NRHP: November 30, 1982

Darius B. Moon (1851–1939) was an architect in Lansing, Michigan, United States. A largely self-educated artist and craftsman, Moon built over 260 structures, most of them in the area of Lansing and East Lansing, Michigan, during a prolific career that stretched from 1860 to 1923.

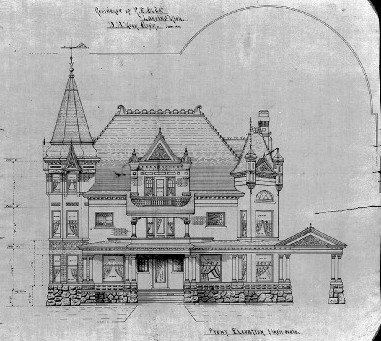
Blueprint for the Olds Mansion

== Early life ==
Darius B. Moon was born in 1851 in Cattaraugus County, New York, and moved to Eaton County, Michigan when he was three years old. He was married in 1877, and moved to Lansing by 1883 and began his career as a builder. He was interested in architecture from an early age, and was likely self-taught.

== Career ==
Following his interest, by 1888 he was working as an architect. He worked alone until 1909, when he partnered with Raymond Spice to form the firm of Moon and Spice. He continued working until his retirement in 1923.

His Queen Anne-style houses range from the Ransom E. Olds residence (demolished in 1971 to make way for the R. E. Olds Freeway) to the Howland House student co-op (originally the home of Chester D. Woodbury) in East Lansing. He also designed residences for Henry Kosltchek, Edward D. Sparrow, Frank Dodge, Judge Person, and H.M. Rogers. In addition to houses, Moon designed four schools, the Olds Motor Works, and the original Sparrow Hospital.

== Works ==
- 1873: Delta Center Trinity Methodist Church
- 1889: Benjamin Davis House
- 1890: Michigan Millers Mutual Fire Insurance Company Building
- 1894: Darius B. Moon House
- 1900: Turner-Dodge House
