= Robert G. Turner House =

Historic house in South Carolina, United States

- U.S. National Register of Historic Places
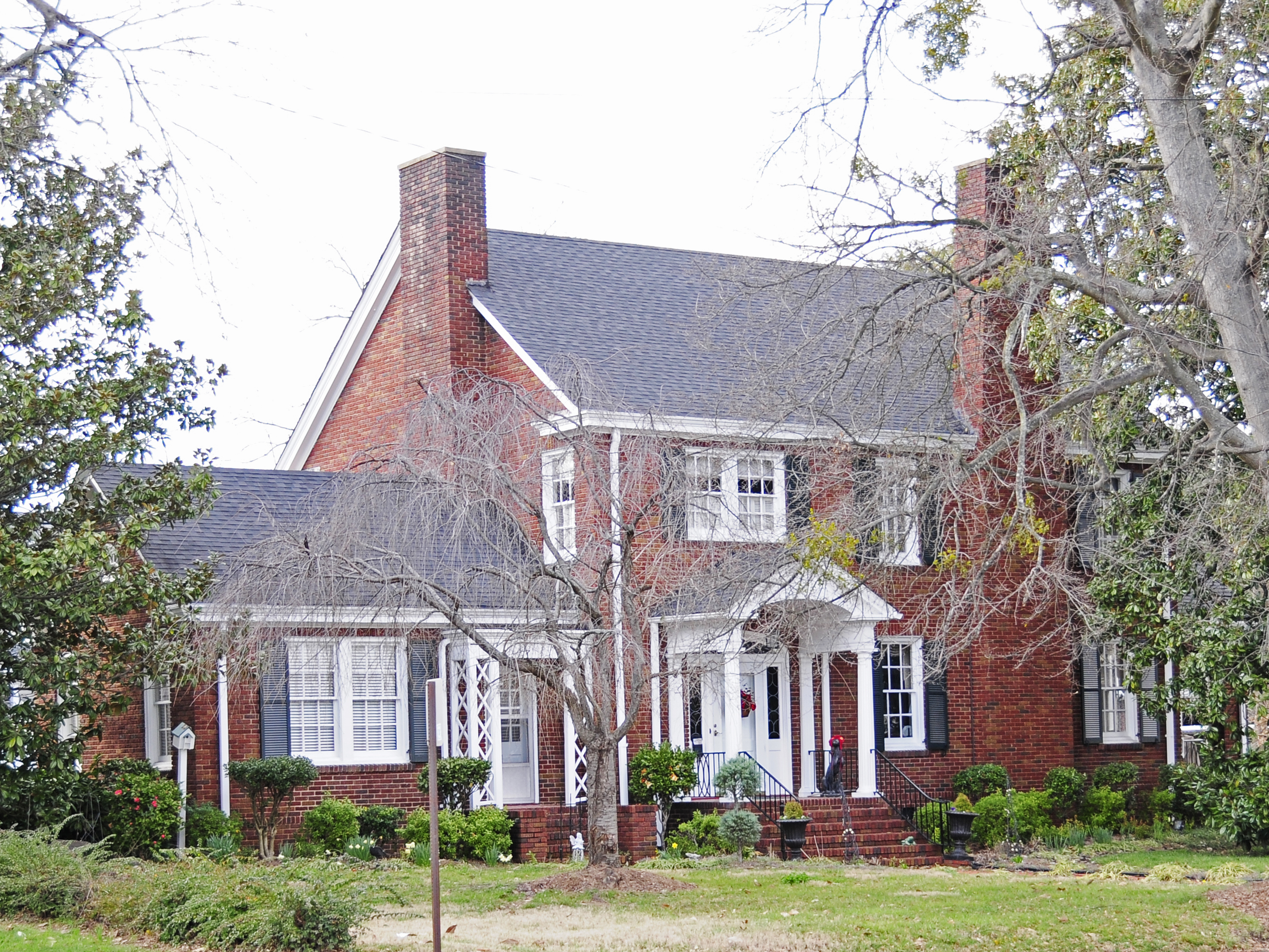
- Robert G Turner House, 2012

- Location within South Carolina Location within the United States
- Location: 305 N. Main St., Greer, South Carolina
- Coordinates: 34.942727°N 82.224742°W
- Area: less than one acre
- Built: 1935
- Architect: William Riddle Ward
- Architectural style: Colonial Revival
- NRHP reference No.: 98001625
- Added to NRHP: February 1, 1999

The Robert G. Turner House is located in Greer, South Carolina. The Colonial Revival style brick veneered house was designed by the prominent Greenville, South Carolina-based architect William Riddle Ward for Robert Gibbs Turner and Turner's wife, Mary. Ward also designed the one-story brick veneered garage to match the house.
