= Masonic Temple Building (Lansing, Michigan) =

- U.S. National Register of Historic Places
- Michigan State Historic Site
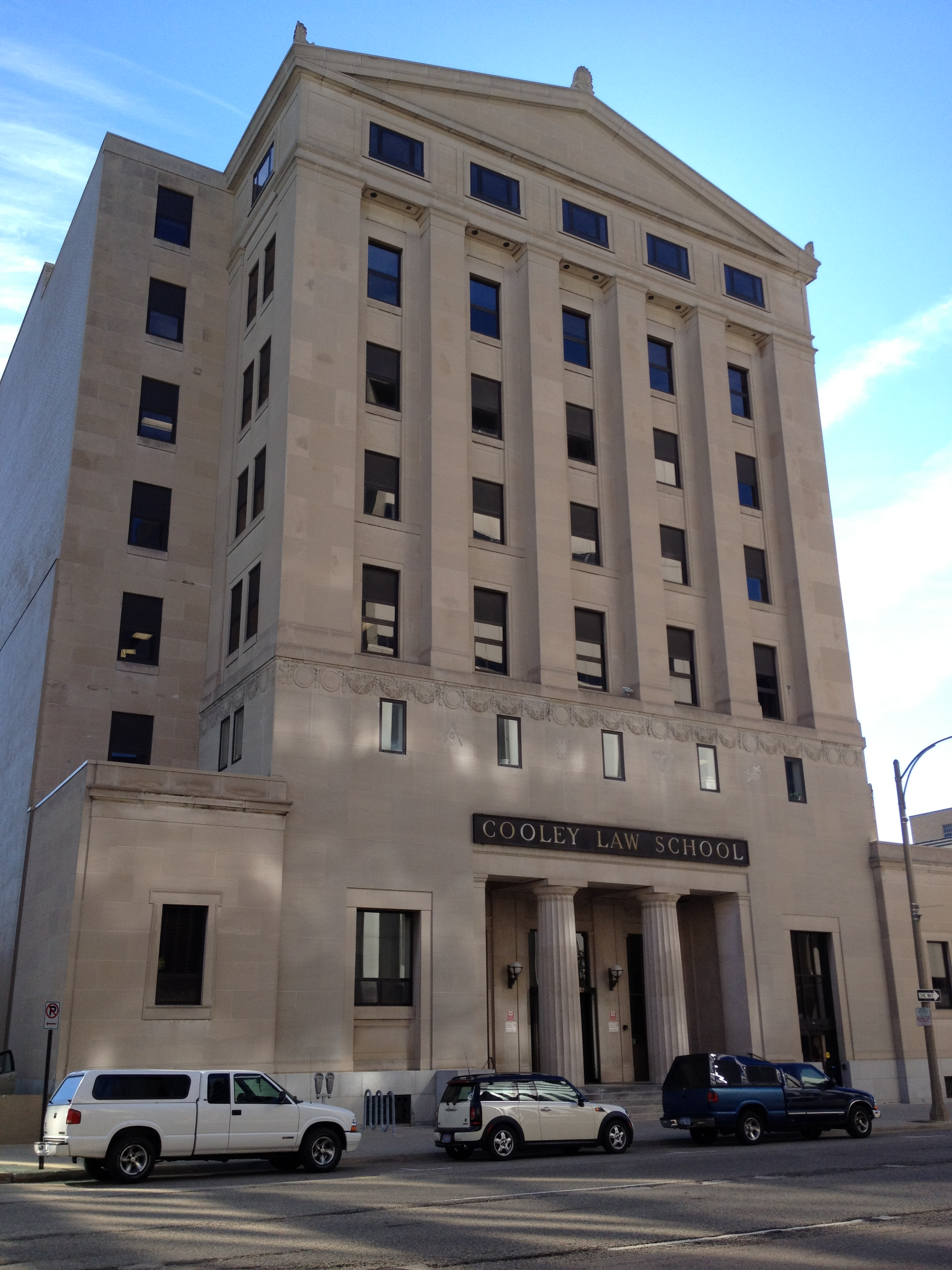

- Location within Michigan Location within the United States
- Interactive map
- Location: 217 S. Capitol Ave., Lansing, Michigan
- Coordinates: 42°43′55″N 84°33′12″W
- Area: less than one acre
- Built: 1924
- Architect: Edwyn A. Bowd
- Architectural style: Classical Revival
- MPS: Downtown Lansing MRA
- NRHP reference No.: 80001868

Significant dates
- Added to NRHP: September 17, 1980
- Designated MSHS: May 15, 1987

The Masonic Temple Building, located at 217 South Capitol Avenue in Lansing, Michigan, is a former Masonic building constructed in 1924. It was listed on the National Register of Historic Places in 1980.

== History ==
Lansing's Masonic community was established in 1849. They constructed their first temple at the turn of the twentieth century, and constructed this much larger one in 1924. The building was designed by Lansing architect Edwyn A. Bowd. The building was purchased by Cooley Law School in 1974. They continued to use the building until 2008, and put it up for sale in 2014. Following several failed proposals for various uses of the building, it was purchased in 2021 by the Boji Group. In September 2023, Lansing Mayor Andy Schor announced acceptance of a proposal made by the Boji Group in 2022 to convert the building to Lansing's City Hall.

== Description ==
The former Lansing Masonic Temple is a seven-story, Classical Revival structure clad with limestone in the front and buff-colored brick on the sides and rear. The main facade has a lower basement containing a recessed entry, above which is a pedimented, antae-decorated block. Anthemion and acroterion motifs are repeated along the roofline and metal grills in the pediment frieze. The temple's interior was extensively altered by Cooley Law School to house classrooms and offices.

== See also ==
- Society of Environmentally Responsible Facilities: Thomas M. Cooley Law School Temple Conference Center
- Cooley Temple Conference Center of the Cooley Law School
- Lansing Teen Court
