= Blue Cross Blue Shield of Michigan =

Health insurance company

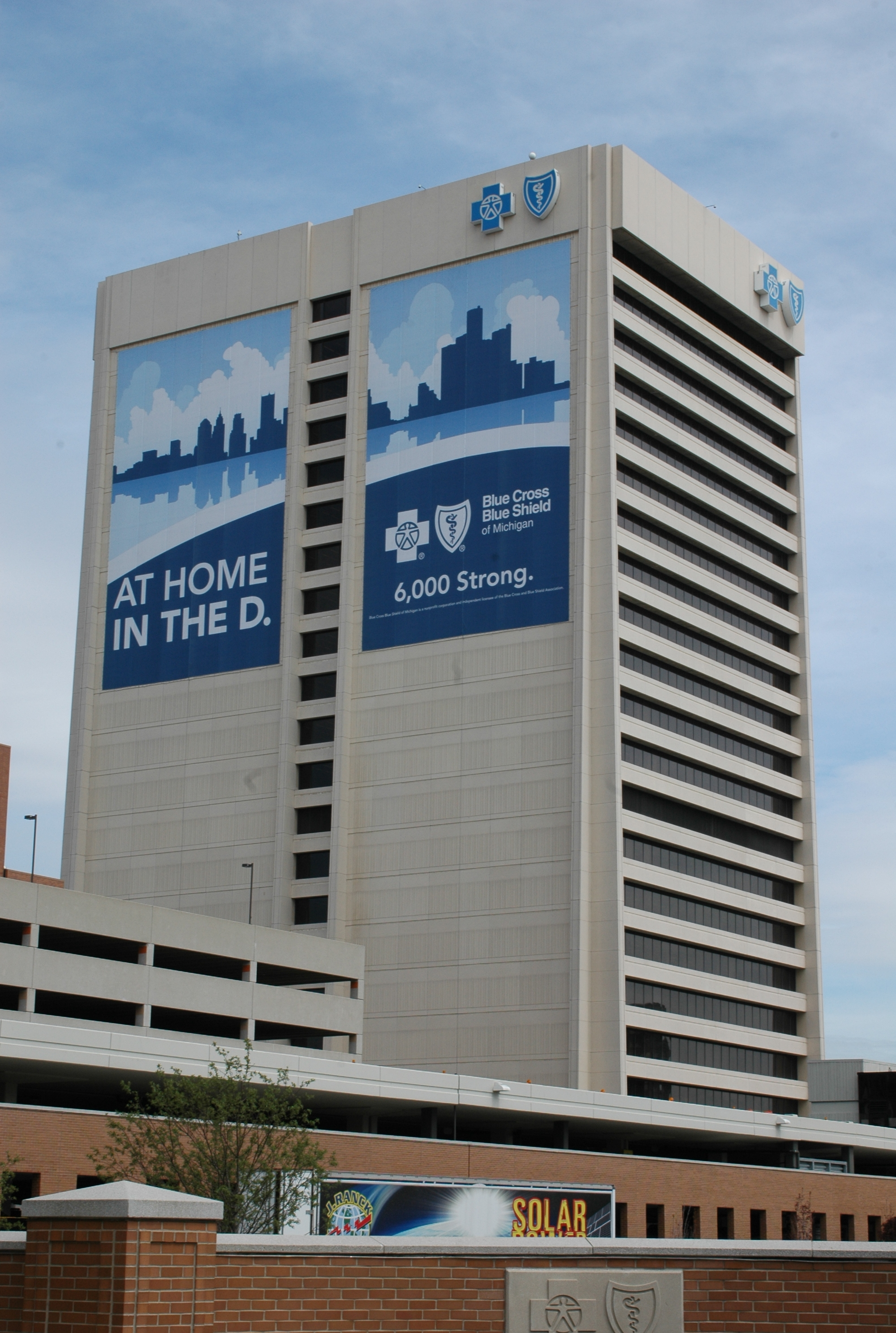
- Detroit headquarters
- Type: Mutual
- Industry: Health insurance
- Founded: 1929
- Headquarters: Detroit, Michigan, United States
- Products: PPOs, HMOs
- Website: bcbsm.com

Blue Cross Blue Shield of Michigan (BCBSM) is an independent licensee of Blue Cross Blue Shield Association.

Currently it is headquartered in 600 E. Lafayette Blvd. in downtown Detroit. Blue Cross Blue Shield of Michigan, a nonprofit mutual insurance company, provides and administers health benefits to more than 4.3 million members residing in Michigan in addition to members of Michigan-headquartered groups who reside outside the state.

In 1998, BCBSM merged several HMOs it owned into the Blue Care Network HMO.

In 2006, BCBSM acquired M-Caid (M-Care), the HMO insurance operations of the University of Michigan Health System, renaming this product to Blue Care Network (BCN).

In 2013, BCBSM's Medicaid operations became Blue Cross Complete of Michigan, a joint venture with AmeriHealth Caritas.

Prior to January, 2014, BCBSM operated as a tax-exempt nonprofit organization. The state legislature enacted a law that became effective in January 2014, which allowed the conversion of the organization to a nonprofit mutual insurance company, ostensibly to level the playing field among health insurers during the transition to new regulations under the Affordable Care Act. As part of the transition to the new corporate structure, BCBSM agreed to several concessions. These included agreeing to pay approximately $90 million in state and local taxes annually and committing to contribute about $1.5 billion over 18 years to fund a state endowment for youth and senior wellness programs.

The worker's compensation insurance firm Accident Fund operates as a for-profit subsidiary of Blue Cross Blue Shield of Michigan.

In 2019, four Michigan addiction treatment facilities filed lawsuits against BCBSM for "unjustified slashing of payments" and "a high number of claims denials for substance use treatment. That same year Michigan Department of Health and Human Services planned on expanding the program to including additional assistance for the serious mentally ill in northern Michigan. The funds come from the Michigan Health Endowment Fund created in 2013 and requires Blue Cross Blue Shield of Michigan to contribute "up to $1.56 billion over 18 years to a health endowment fund that benefits Michigan residents".

In 2023, Blue Cross Blue Shield of Vermont merged into Blue Cross Blue Shield of Michigan.
