= Ingham County Courthouse =

- U.S. National Register of Historic Places
- Michigan State Historic Site
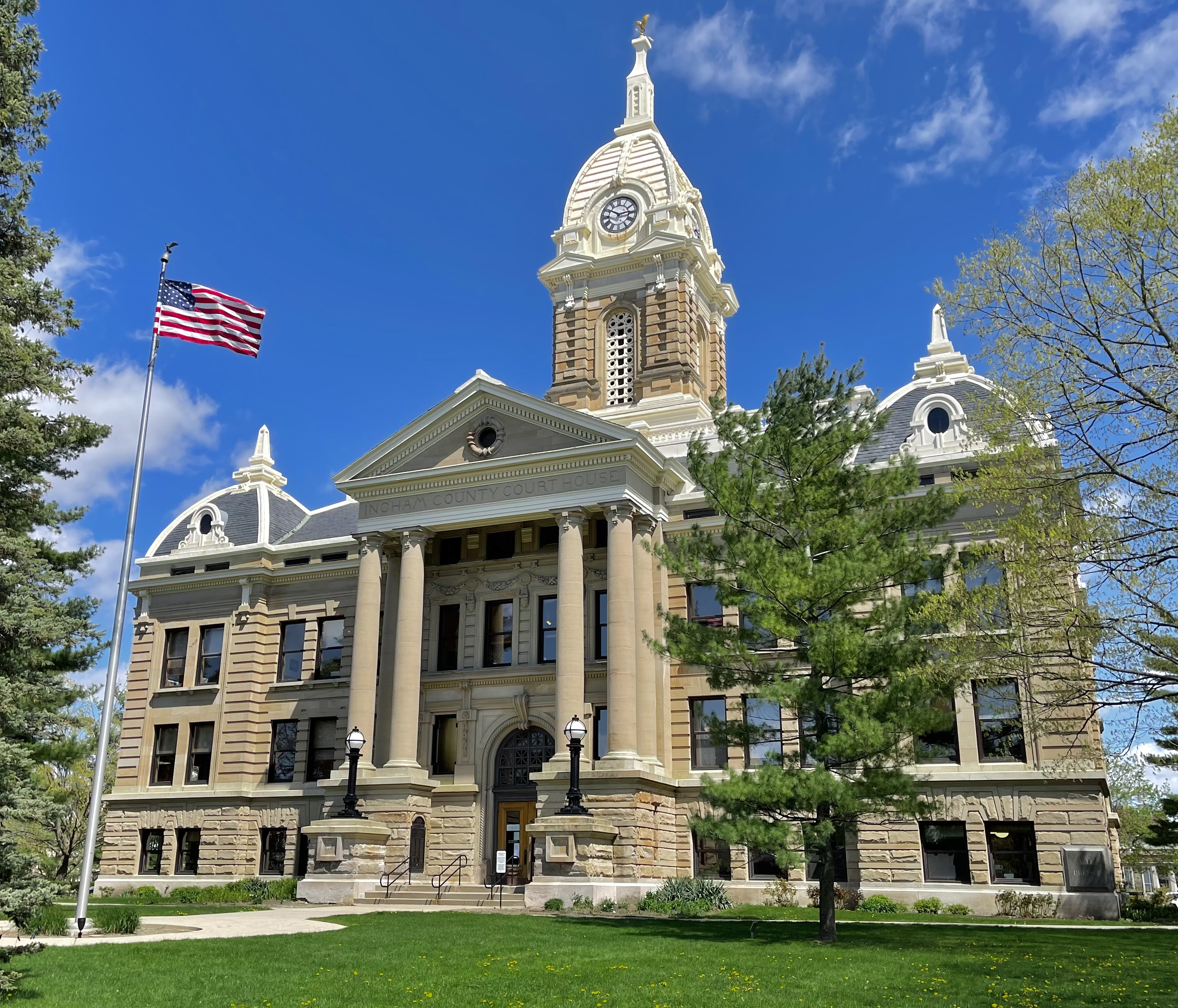

- Location within Michigan Location within the United States
- Interactive map showing the location of Ingham County Courthouse
- Location: 315 S. Jefferson St; Mason, Michigan
- Coordinates: 42.5797°N 84.4425°W
- Area: less than one acre
- Built: 1904
- Architect: Edwyn A. Bowd; builder: Geo. W. Rickman & Sons Co.
- Architectural style: Beaux Arts
- NRHP reference No.: 71000397

Significant dates
- Added to NRHP: December 13, 1971
- Designated MSHS: May 18, 1971

The Ingham County Courthouse is an historic government building located at 315 South Jefferson Street in Mason, Ingham County, Michigan. It occupies an entire city block bounded by South Jefferson, East Ash, South Barnes and East Maple Street. Constructed from 1902 to 1904, it is Ingham County's third courthouse and the second on this block, which is directly north of the site of the first courthouse. Designed by noted Lansing architect Edwyn A. Bowd in the Beaux Arts style of architecture, it was built by George W. Rickman and Sons Company of Kalamazoo.

The Ingham County Courthouse was listed on the Michigan Register of Historic Places on May 18, 1971 and was listed on the National Register of Historic Places on December 13, 1971.

== Overview ==
Today building is the official county seat of government, although some administrative functions are conducted at the Veterans Memorial Courthouse at 313 West Kalamazoo Street and at other locations in Lansing, the county's largest city as well as the capital of Michigan. The building houses the Ingham County Board of Commissioners, County Clerk, County Controller, County Treasurer, Register of Deeds, Equalization Department and 30th Circuit Court.

== History ==
Construction on the new courthouse began in fall 1902, with the cornerstone laid on May 5, 1903, and completion at the end of 1904 at a cost of $96,678. The courthouse was dedicated on May 9, 1905. It underwent a renovation from 1980 to 1995.

== Architecture ==
The courthouse is three stories and designed in the Federal and Beaux Arts styles. The exterior of the is faced in Berea Sandstone quarried in Amherst, Ohio, with a black Buckingham Slate roof. In 1912, the building's clock was purchased from Seth Thomas Clock Co. and its bell from McShane Bell Foundry.

== In the news ==
Famous trials, real or fictional, which have taken place here include:

- 1969: The Algiers Motel incident murder trial of Detroit police officer Ronald August was moved to the Ingham County Courthouse from Wayne County after the publication of John Hersey's 1968 book on the incident.
- 2011: The courthouse scenes of the film Real Steel starring Hugh Jackman were taken at the Ingham County Courthouse.
- 2017-18: Former USA Gymnastics doctor Larry Nassar pled guilty and was sentenced to a de facto life sentence for child sexual abuse in 2017-18. Many victim impact statements became highly publicized stories as part of the Me Too movement. One of Nassar's three cases related to the USA Gymnastics sexual abuse scandal was carried out at the Ingham County Courthouse.

== Gallery ==
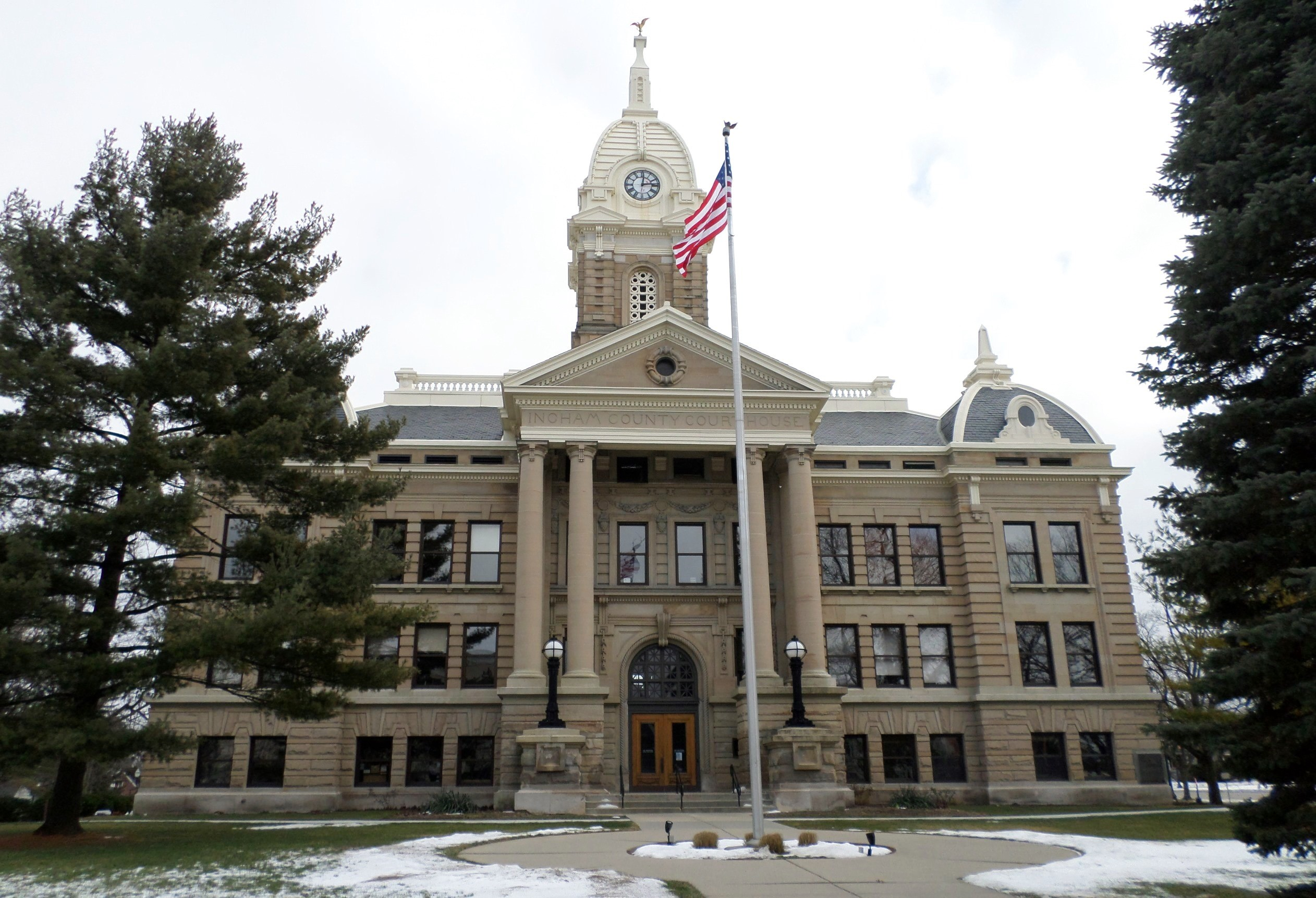
The courthouse in January 2016

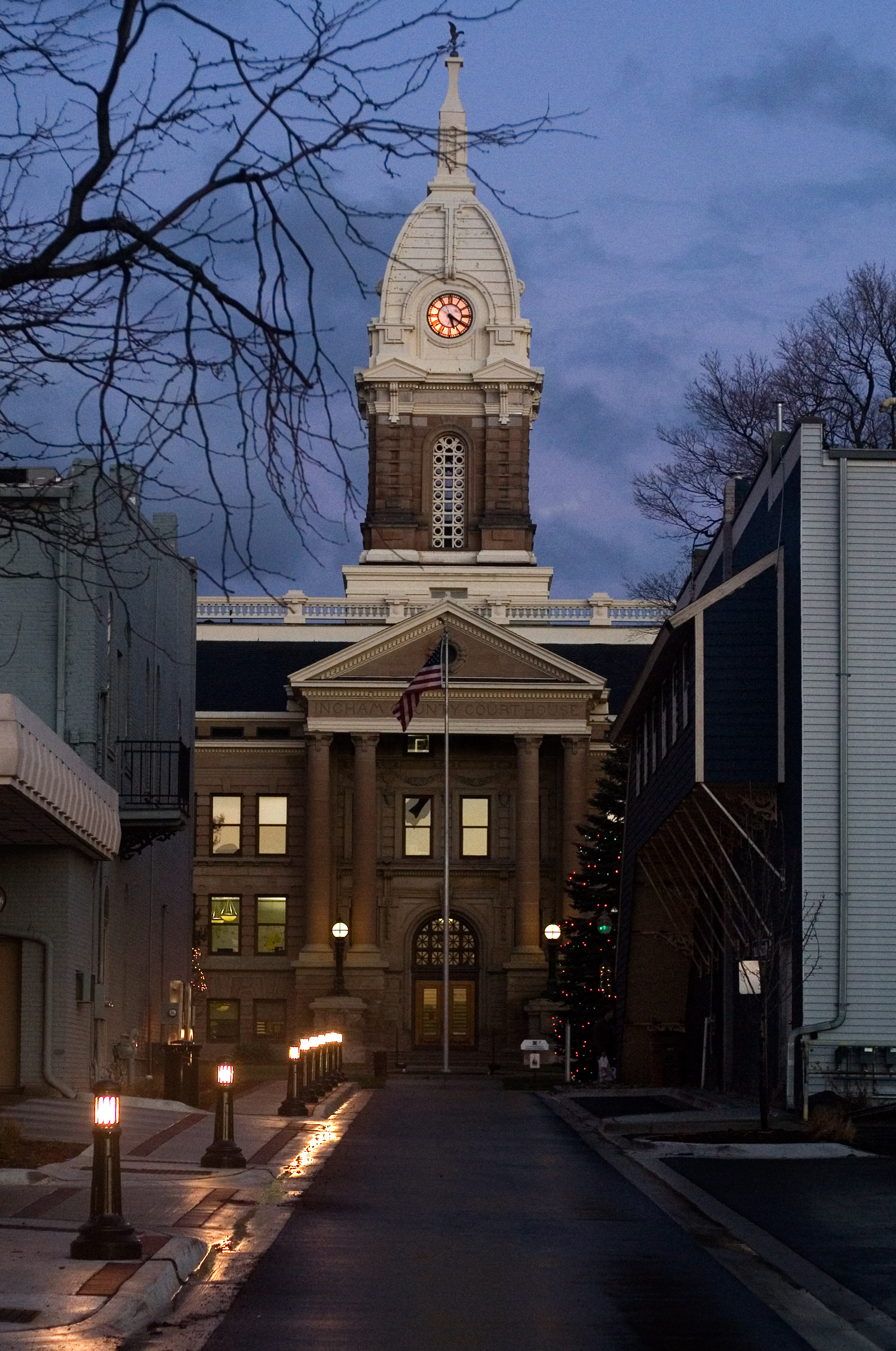
Terminating vista of the courthouse at night
