= Bowd–Munson Company =

Bowd–Munson Company was an architectural firm in Lansing, Michigan. The firm was a partnership between Edwyn A. Bowd and Orlie Munson.

Bowd was born at Cheltenham, England, on November 11, 1865. He designed the Lewis Cass Building. He also designed many buildings at Michigan State University (MSU) in East Lansing beginning with Old Botany in 1892 and continuing on his own and at the firm with Marshall Hall, Agriculture Hall, Giltner Hall (1913 portion), IM Recreative Sports Circle, and Spartan Stadium. The firm designed most of the buildings on the MSU campus until 1940 often in Collegiate Gothic style.

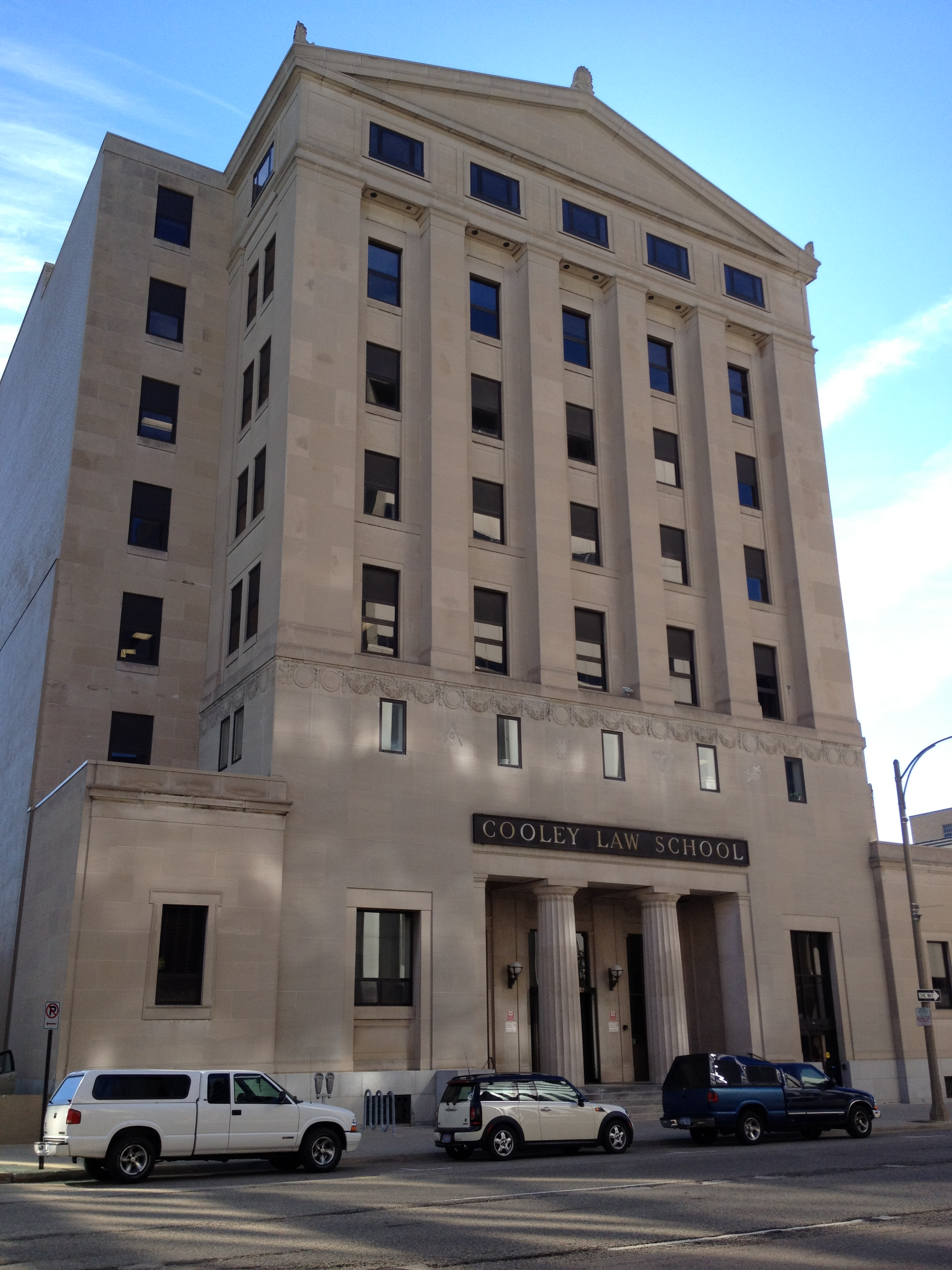
Masonic Temple in Lansing, now the Main Building for Cooley Law School

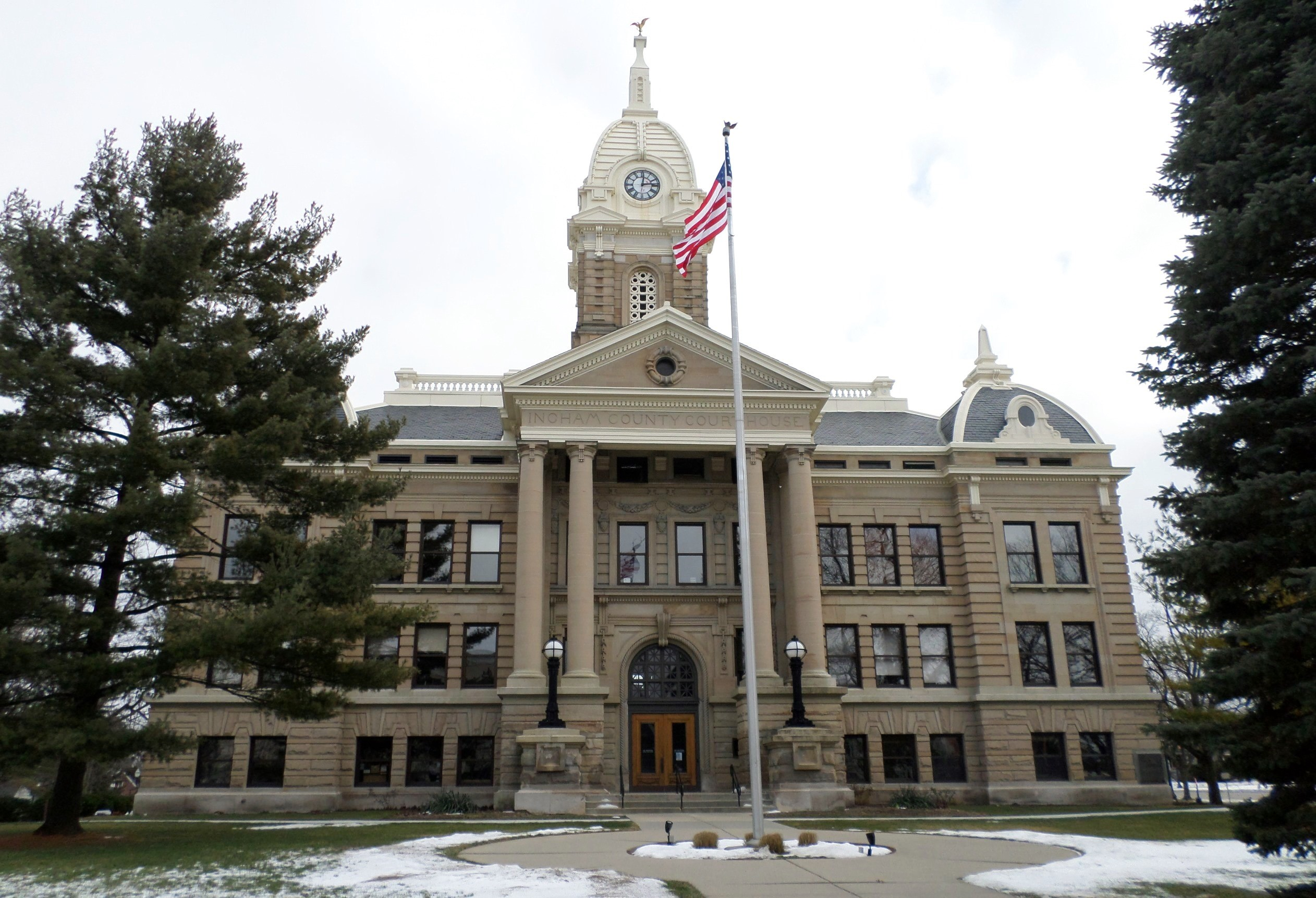
Ingham County Courthouse in Mason, Michigan

== Work ==
- Charles E. Chamberlain Federal Building & Post Office, 315 W. Allegan St. In Lansing, Bowd-Munson Co.
- J.W. Knapp Company Building, 300 S. Washington Avenue in Lansing, Bowd–Munson Company. Streamline Moderne in style.
- Ottawa Street Power Station, 217 E. Ottawa St. Lansing, MI Bowd-Munson Co.
- Spartan Stadium (East Lansing, Michigan)
- Demonstration Hall
- Accident Fund Company National Headquarters (1940)
- Masonic Temple Building (Lansing, Michigan) (1924) (now the main building for Cooley Law School) in Lansing
- Michigan School for the Blind Abigail Building (1916) in Lansing
- Ingham County Courthouse (1904) in Mason, Michigan
- Michigan State University Museum
- First Baptist Church in Lansing
- Berkey Hall (1947)
- Spartan Stadium (both the 1923 original and the 1959 renovation)
- Jenison Field House (1940)
- Ionia Armory / Community Center (1908), Ionia, MI
