= Abigail Rogers =

American advocate for women's rights and women's education

Abigail Rogers (1818–1869) was an American advocate for women's rights and women's education. Her work helped women eventually gain access to colleges such as Michigan State University and the University of Michigan. She personally helped educate over one thousand women. She founded the Michigan Women's College, and was posthumously inducted into the Michigan Women's Hall of Fame in 2007. Rogers spent her whole life advocating for the admittance of women into Michigan universities.

== Early Life ==
Abigail Rogers grew up with her sisters Delia and Eliza. Eliza Rogers was the first female teacher to hold a position at the Genesee Wesleyan Seminary in Lima, New York. She was hired in 1832. She eventually rose to the role of preceptress, which allowed her to work as a combined teacher and housemother to female students. Delia and Abigail were two of her pupils, and ended up succeeding her at GWS.

== Career ==
Delia and Abigail Rogers left New York for Michigan around 1847. There, Abigail worked as the preceptress of the coeducational Albion Wesleyan Seminary. In the early 1850s, Rogers lived in Ypsilanti, Michigan, where she briefly taught high school.

In 1852, she was hired as the first preceptress and teacher of botany and belles lettres at the Michigan State Normal School - now Eastern Michigan University. The Michigan State Normal School was created in response to an act passed in 1849, allowing the admission of both sexes into normal schools. When it opened, it was the only normal school west of Pittsburgh. Rogers was the only woman on a five-person staff. The school's purpose was to train secondary school teachers, and it did not provide an opportunity for higher education.

That same year, Rogers was elected as a founding member of the Michigan State Teachers Association, to increase her role in public advocacy work. Within the association, she gave reports and speeches at the organization's semiannual conferences and helped edit the Michigan Journal of Education and Teacher’s Magazine.

== The Michigan Women's College ==
In 1855, Governor Kinsley S. Bingham vocally endorsed a public female seminary, and a bill was proposed in the State House of Representatives. However, the bill died while other male-centered bills were passed. Due to this, Delia and Abigail Rogers decided to move to Lansing and create a female-forward college.

In September 1855, Abigail Rogers founded the Michigan Women's College in Lansing, Michigan, with Delia Rogers and pioneer James Turner, with the stated goal "to keep before the public mind as constantly as they could, the duty of the State to provide for the education of its daughters as it had already provided for the education of its sons." The college held daily sessions in the Michigan State Capitol until acquiring a location of its their own in 1858. By 1867, Rogers had helped to educate over a thousand women from Michigan and other states.

When Rogers was teaching, it was never an impediment if a student could not afford to pay. Historian Eliza Smith said of Rogers, "No young woman anxious for improvement, but lacking means to meet the expense of tuition, ever stated her case in vain to [Rogers] this true earnest friend of all who wished to help themselves."

Despite being one of the most successful schools for women at the time, it closed after Abigail’s abrupt death in 1869.

By the spring of 1856, Delia and Abigail had partnered with local businessmen to obtain a 20-acre site in North Lansing to be the official location of their school. The cornerstone for the new building was laid on July 10, 1857. Staff and students moved into the building in the fall of 1858.

== Legacy ==
In 1869, Rogers died suddenly while attending a fundraising event. Unable to carry on the work of the school without her sister, Delia permanently closed the school following her sister's death.

Later that same year, in part as a result of her work, Michigan State University began to admit women, and the next year, 1870, the University of Michigan began to admit women. The Michigan Women's College would eventually become the Michigan School for the Blind in 1880.
