= Robert Mahoney =

American politician from Michigan

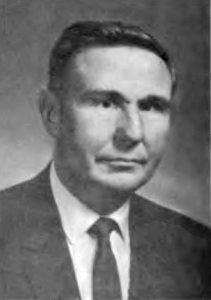

Member of the Michigan House of Representatives
- In office January 1, 1955 – December 31, 1972
- Succeeded by: Morris Hood, Jr.
- Constituency: Wayne County 3rd district (1955–1964); 6th district (1965–1972)

Personal details
- Born: October 16, 1921 Duluth, Minnesota
- Died: March 30, 2017 (aged 95) East Lansing, Michigan
- Resting place: St. Joseph Cemetery, Lansing, Michigan
- Party: Democratic
- Spouse: Jennie Kubinger

Robert Daniel Mahoney (October 16, 1921 – March 30, 2017) was a Democratic member of the Michigan House of Representatives from 1955 through 1972.

Born in Duluth, Minnesota in 1921, Mahoney lost his sight at age 15. He attended Northern High School (Detroit, Michigan) and the Michigan School for the Blind in Lansing before marrying Jennie Kubinger in 1941.

He worked as a door-to-door salesman before his election to the House in 1954 to represent part of northeast Detroit, becoming the first blind member of that chamber in state history. As a legislator, Mahoney sponsored the bill to provide a state identification card for people without a driver's license, and the bill requiring vending stands in state buildings to be run by a blind proprietor. He was defeated for re-election in the 1972 Democratic primary and was appointed a member of the Wayne County Commission.

Mahoney died on March 30, 2017, aged 95.
