= George Wurtzel =

American blind artist

George Wurtzel is an American artist, craftsman, and blind woodworking instructor. He has taught classes in woodworking at the LightHouse for the Blind and Visually Impaired's Enchanted Hills Camp in Napa County, California and owned a furniture studio in Minneapolis, Minnesota, with a new shop set to open in 2019 in Greeneville, Tennessee.

== Biography ==
Born in 1954 in Traverse City, Michigan, George Wurtzel lost his eyesight at a young age due to hereditary retinitis pigmentosa. He attended the Michigan School for the Blind at the same time as blind musician Stevie Wonder, for whom he later carved a one-third scale concert piano replica as an achievement award. At age 19 he started his woodworking career. He owned a successful furniture business in Michigan, where his projects included the renovation of the historic Traverse City courthouse, for which he built a new set of doors. When the business encountered financial difficulty he relocated to North Carolina in 1982, where he studied furniture production management at Catawba Valley Community College. Wurtzel returned to Michigan, serving as executive director of Opportunities Unlimited for the Blind, a non-profit organization which focuses on building life skills and independence for blind and low-vision children. Through OUB, Wurtzel operated a camp for blind children, which won the 2009 Dr. Jacob Bolotin Award for "outstanding programs serving blind people."

Wurtzel moved to Minnesota in 2009, opening a furniture store in South Minneapolis. In 2014, his work was included in the Museum of Contemporary Art in Detroit. In 2018 he announced the acquisition of space for a new workspace and gallery in Greeneville, Tennessee.

Although he takes advice from sighted colleagues on the coloration of pieces of wood, Wurtzel identifies most of the characteristics of wood by feeling its texture, often using water or steam to enlarge the grain, and can identify different types of wood by smell. His artwork is known for the use of spalted wood, which has distinctive patterns of fungal growth that he identifies by touch and incorporates into his artwork.

Wurtzel has been an instructor for the American Association of Woodturners, Blindness Learning in New Dimensions (BLIND), Woodworking for the Blind, and the Enchanted Hills Camp operated by LightHouse for the Blind and Visually Impaired. At Enchanted Hills, Wurtzel instructed visually impaired students on technical skills, artistic development, and the safe use of power tools including saws and lathes; he also founded the Tactile Art Center, a gallery for art which is designed to appeal to the sense of touch, also located at Enchanted Hills.

In addition to woodworking, Wurtzel has worked as a bicycle and auto mechanic and trained Arabian horses for endurance riding. An accomplished cross-country skier, he competed for the U.S. Paralympic team in 1980, was on the first American expedition to ski across Lapland, and helped bring the 1980 Ski for Light event to his hometown of Traverse City, Michigan. In 2018, he was featured in a televised advertising campaign for Subaru in which he is shown leading a group of travelers through the wilderness, something he has been known to do for visitors to Enchanted Hills.
