= Accident Fund =

American workers' compensation insurance company

Accident Fund Insurance
- Company type: Subsidiary
- Industry: Insurance
- Founded: 1912
- Headquarters: Lansing, Michigan
- Key people: Lisa Corless (CEO); Stephan Cooper (President, Workers' Compensation Division)
- Products: Workers' compensation
- Number of employees: 675
- Parent: Blue Cross Blue Shield of Michigan
- Website: www.accidentfund.com

Accident Fund Insurance Company of America is an American workers' compensation insurance company headquartered in Lansing, Michigan. The company is a member of AF Group, a provider of insurance. Insurance policies may be issued by any of the following companies within AF Group: Accident Fund Insurance Company of America, Accident Fund National Insurance Company, Accident Fund General Insurance Company, United Wisconsin Insurance Company, Third Coast Insurance Company or CompWest Insurance Company.

The company is led by Lisa Corless, President and CEO.

== History ==
Accident Fund was founded as a state operation in 1912. It was purchased by Blue Cross Blue Shield of Michigan in 1994.

In April 2011, Accident Fund completed redevelopment of the Ottawa Street Power Station, an Art Deco landmark on the Grand River in downtown Lansing, Michigan, as its new corporate headquarters.

In June 2024 the company was victim to a cyber attack breaching their information servers and compromising the data. As of August 2024, the company is still undergoing processes to return to normal, and their services are still being disrupted.
