= Spartan Stadium =

Home stadium of the Michigan State Spartans

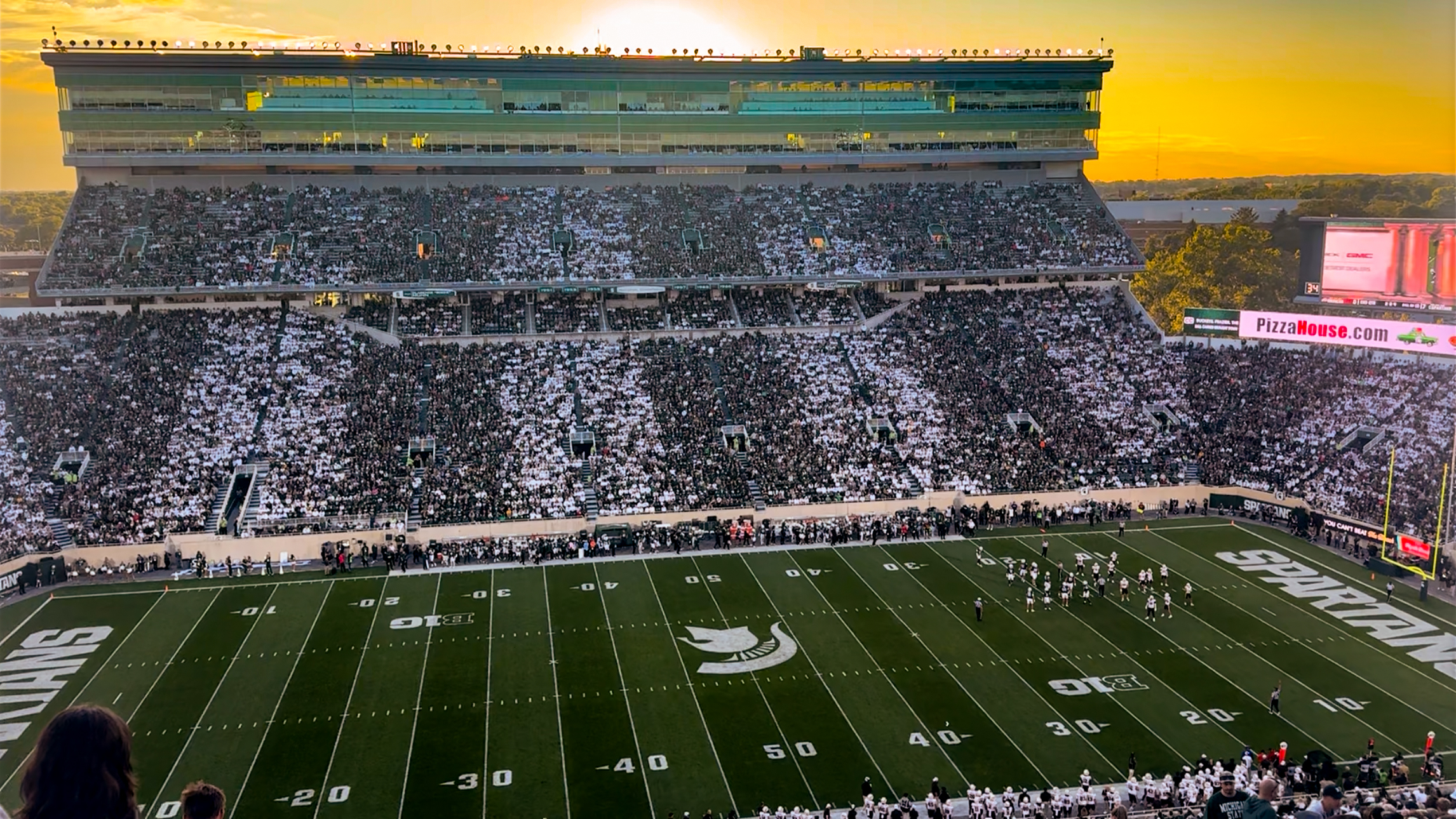
- Spartan Stadium in 2025

- Location in Michigan Location in the United States
- Former names: College Field (1923–1935); Macklin Field (1935–1948); Macklin Stadium (1948–1957)
- Address: 1 Spartan Way
- Location: East Lansing, Michigan
- Coordinates: 42°43′41″N 84°29′5″W
- Capacity: 74,866 (2022–present) Former capacity List: 75,005 (2005–2022); 72,027 (1994–2004); 76,000 (1957–1993); 60,000 (1956); 51,000 (1948–1955); 26,000 (1935–1947); 14,000 (1923–1934)
- Surface: Grass (1923–1968, 2002–present); Astroturf (1978–2001); TartanTurf (1969–1977)
- Record attendance: 80,401

Construction
- Groundbreaking: 1923
- Opened: October 6, 1923; 103 years ago
- Renovated: 2005, 2014
- Expanded: 1935, 1948, 1956, 1957, 2005
- Cost: $160,001 ($3.02 million in 2025 dollars)
- Architects: Edwyn Bowd (1923 field); Orlie Munson (1957 stadium); HNTB Architecture (2004 expansion)

Tenants
- Michigan State Spartans (NCAA) (1923–present)

Website
- msuspartans.com/spartan-stadium

Spartan Stadium is an outdoor stadium in East Lansing, Michigan, United States that opened in 1923. It is primarily used for football, and is the home field of the Michigan State University Spartans. After the addition of luxury boxes and club seating in 2004–2005, the capacity of the stadium grew from 72,027 to 75,005—though it has held more than 80,000 fans—making it the Big Ten's sixth largest stadium.

== History ==
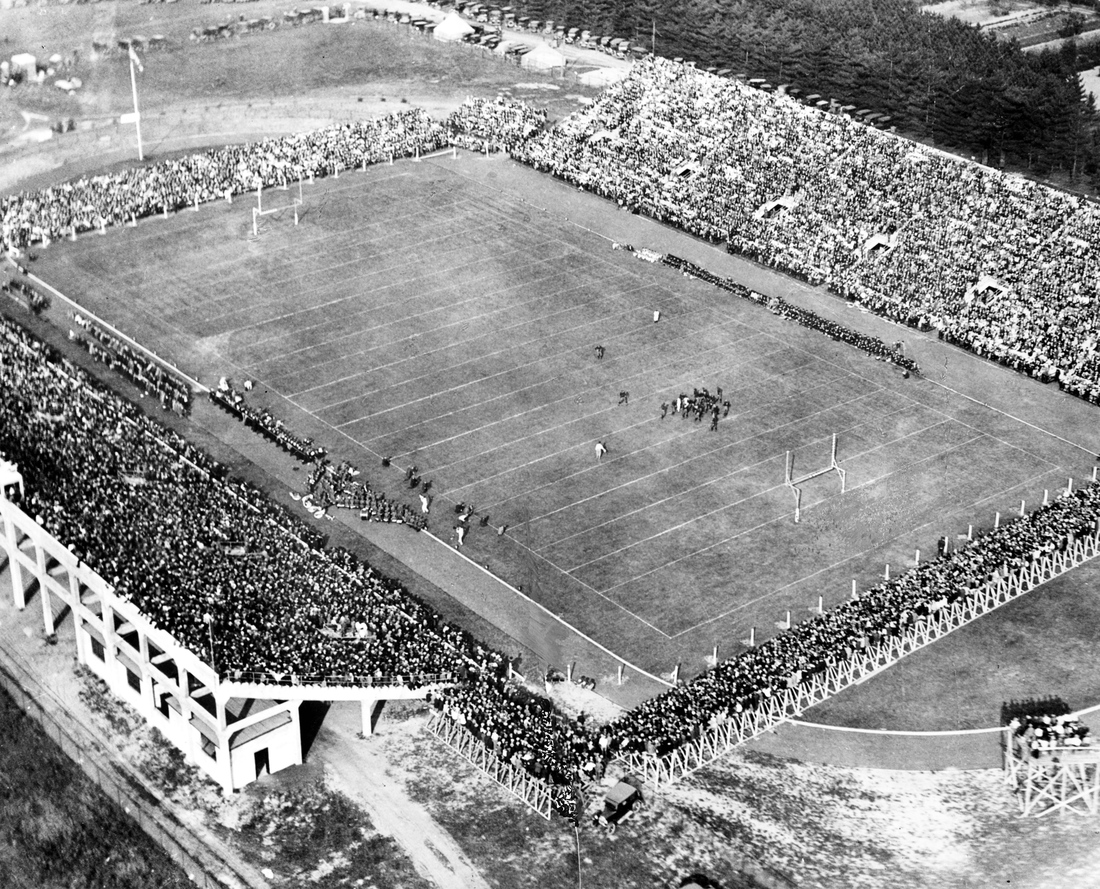
Spartan Stadium in 1924

In the early 1920s, school officials decided to construct a new stadium to replace Old College Field. The resulting stadium—the lower half of the current stadium—was ready in the fall of 1923 with a capacity of 14,000. Over the years, the stadium grew. In 1936, the field's track was removed and permanent north and south endzone seating was added, increasing the seating capacity to 26,000. This expansion was built as a part of the Works Progress Administration, an agency created by the New Deal that employed Americans to carry out public works projects. The facility was dedicated as Macklin Field, named in honor of former coach John Macklin, who put Michigan State football on the map with a 29–5 record from 1911 to 1915 with victories over big-name programs such as Michigan, Notre Dame, Ohio State, Penn State, and Wisconsin.

After admittance into the Big Ten in 1948, Michigan State increased stadium capacity to 51,000 and the field was renamed Macklin Stadium. With Spartan football attracting national attention under Clarence "Biggie" Munn and Hugh "Duffy" Daugherty, 9,000 seats were added in 1956. The following season, the east and west sides were double-decked, boosting the capacity to 76,000. That same season, the stadium received its current name, Spartan Stadium. The school installed permanent lights in 2017.

In 1969, TartanTurf replaced the natural grass field and a modern scoreboard was added in 1973. In 1978, AstroTurf replaced the TartanTurf. A new modern video scoreboard was added before the 1991 season. Renovations improving sight lines, field security, handicap access, and club seats in 1994 reduced Spartan Stadium's capacity to 72,027. New turf was also installed in the summer of 1994. In 1998, Spartan Stadium's sound system was upgraded, adding a 21' x 27' Mitsubishi Diamond Vision video board to the south end and a message board to the north end. Home to one of the top turfgrass research programs in the nation, Michigan State installed a natural grass field in 2002. The most recent expansion was completed in August 2005. A new press box, 24 luxury suites, and 862 club seats were constructed on the west side of Spartan Stadium. This addition made Spartan Stadium the tallest building in East Lansing.

== Homefield advantage ==
In 2010–12, the Spartans won 15 straight games in Spartan Stadium, recording the program's longest home streak since winning 19 straight from 1950 to 1953. Michigan State went undefeated at home in back-to-back seasons (2010 and 2011) including marquee wins over Wisconsin, Michigan, and Notre Dame, marking the first consecutive perfect home seasons since 1955–56.

== Special events ==
=== Hockey ===
On October 6, 2001, a rink was constructed at the center of the stadium for Michigan State's season-opening game against archrival Michigan. Dubbed "The Cold War", 74,554 watched No. 1 nationally ranked Michigan State and No. 4 nationally ranked Michigan play to a 3–3 tie. Country artist Shannon Brown sang during the second intermission. For almost nine years, the "Cold War" game held the world record for the largest ice hockey crowd in history, before being surpassed by a 2010 game played at Michigan Stadium.

The game is credited with starting the trend of outdoor ice hockey games in large stadiums.

Date	Away team	Score	Home team	Attendance
October 6, 2001	Michigan	3-3	Michigan State	74,554

=== Concerts ===
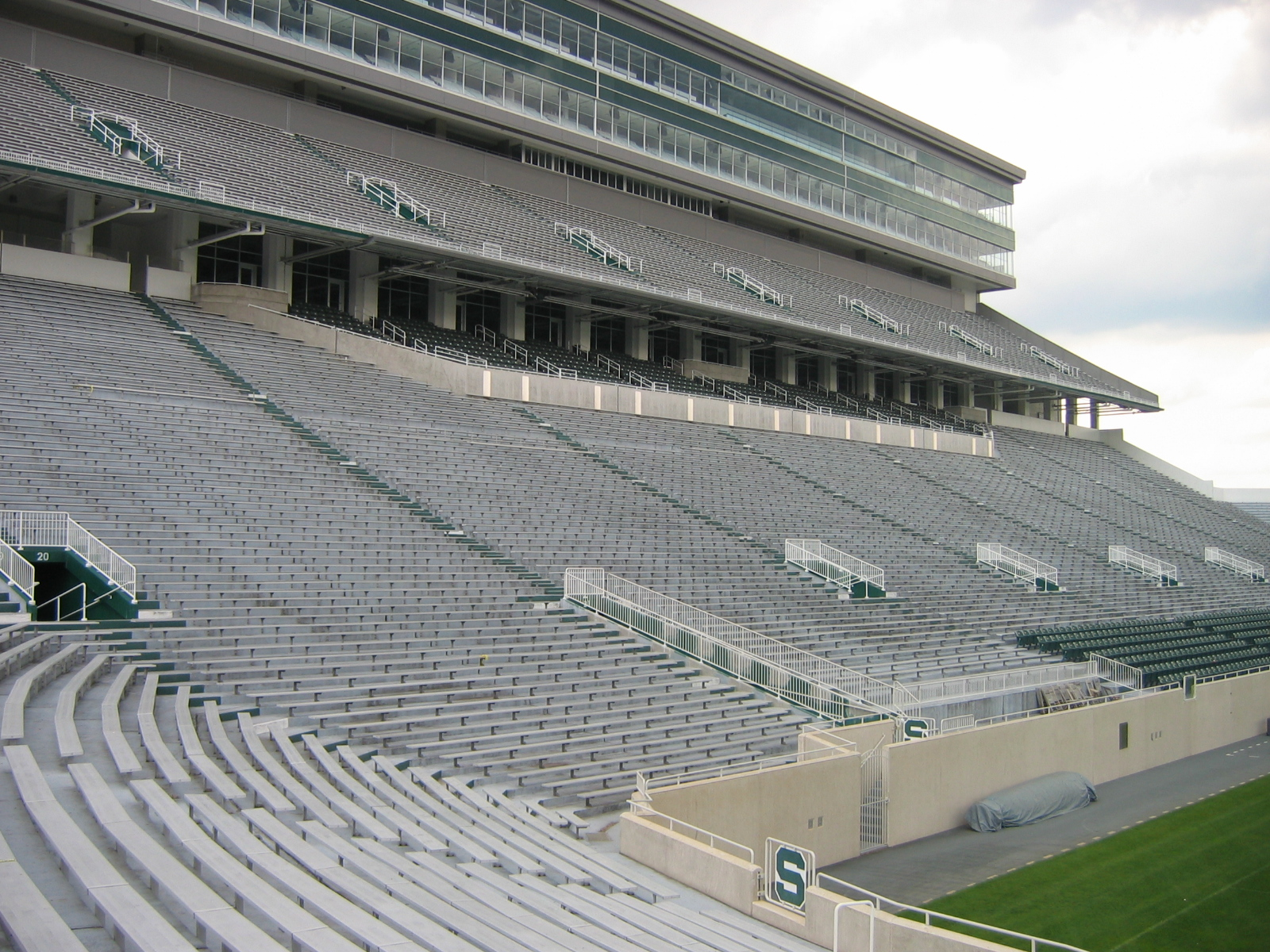
Grandstands as seen in 2008

Date	Artist	Opening act(s)	Tour / Concert name	Attendance	Revenue	Notes
September 9, 1994	The Rolling Stones	Bryan Adams; Blind Melon; Lenny Kravitz	Voodoo Lounge Tour	47,797 / 47,797	$2,128,825	
June 26, 2011	U2	Florence + The Machine	U2 360° Tour	63,824 / 63,824	$5,064,980	The show was originally to be held on June 30, 2010, but was postponed, due to Bono's emergency back surgery. This was the first time they had played in East Lansing since a bar show in 1981. It was their first performance in Michigan since 2005.

== Expansion ==
On September 3, 2005, Spartan Stadium unveiled an eight-story, 268,947-square-foot (24,986.0 m^{2}) expansion which had been under construction since 2003. At a total cost of $64 million the project created:

- 24 luxury suites
- 800 club seats
- The "Grand Entrance" featuring high ceilings, glass walls, marble floors and a new home for the original Spartan statue.
- 18,000-square-foot (1,700 m^{2}) luxury concourse
- Office space for Career Services, University Advancement and the MSU Alumni Office.
- Modern recruiting lounge
- Upgraded stadium-wide bathroom and concourse renovations
- An increase of 3,000 seats, bringing the total stadium capacity to 75,005.

The Stadium renovation was done under a joint venture of Clark Construction and Barton Malow Construction Company.

== Video board renovation ==
On January 27, 2012, the Michigan State Board of Trustees voted for a Video Board Renovation and Audio Package upgrade. The cost of the renovation was $10 million. Features include:

- One of a kind LED wall measuring 10'x450' spanning the North End zone Wall.
- Two Auxiliary Video Boards in the North End zone to provide 1,654 SF of video area per board.
- One South End zone Video Board, the largest in the Big Ten Conference with 5,412 SF, surpassing current leader Minnesota (5,184 SF).
- Video board was built and installed by Panasonic
- Video, graphic, and content control system installed by Click Effects
- Video replay (control) room built by Comprehensive Technical Group Atlanta

New Spartan Stadium Scoreboard

The new scoreboards were unveiled on August 31, 2012, when the Spartans defeated #24 Boise State 17–13. The game was the 12th night game in the history of Spartan Stadium.

== 2024 video board and suite renovation ==
On December 13, 2024, the Michigan State Board of Trustees approved $28 million for improvements to Spartan Stadium, with three primary focuses:

- Replacing the video boards from the previous renovation, which were "two years beyond their anticipated life cycle."
- Renovating the 4th, 7th, and 8th floors of the West Tower premium seating to "enhance outdated technology, provide modern ADA-compliant restroom facilities, and include updates to seating, flooring and concessions."
- Planning for general modernization upgrades, such as structural repairs, additional and upgraded restrooms, and improvements to seating and concourses.

Out of the $28 million approved for the project, $10 million was allotted for the video board, with the remaining $18 million going to the West Tower renovations. Both projects are scheduled to conclude in August 2025.

== Tailgating ==
Game days at Spartan Stadium provide opportunity for tailgating. Popular locations include the tennis courts, "the rock", and around the MSU library area on north campus. Open alcohol is permitted on campus during tailgating hours, with the exception of Munn field.

== Traditions ==
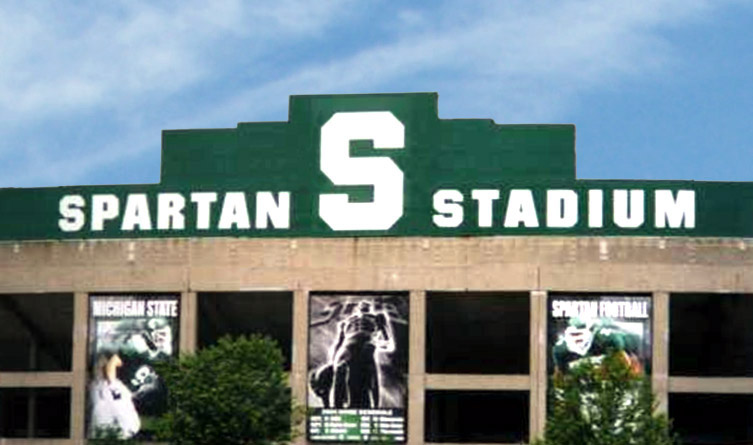
The old view of the south side of the stadium

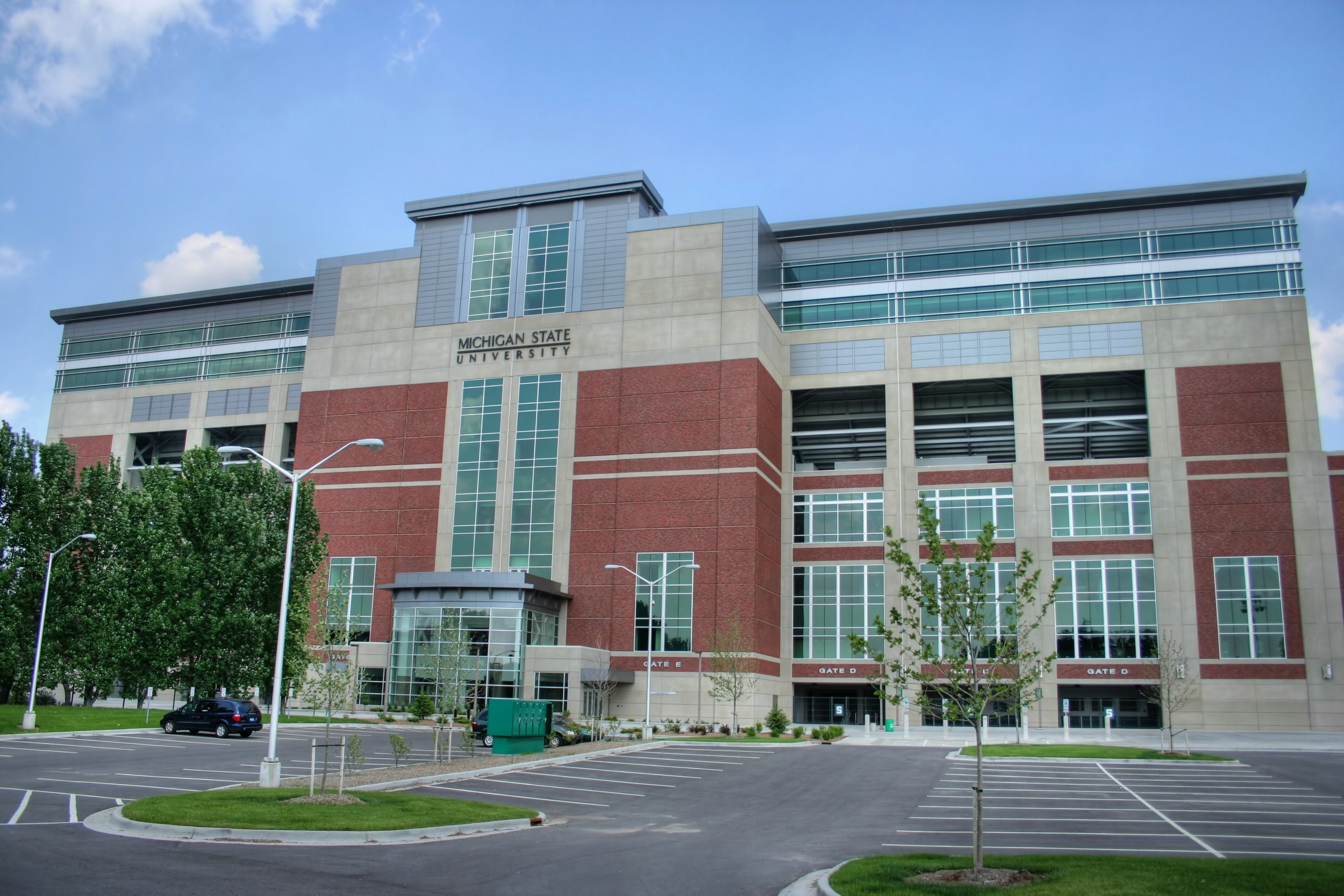
Stadium facade

- "The Spartan Walk" – On the morning of each home game, the team completes a 10-minute walk from their hotel at the Kellogg Center, crossing the Red Cedar River, passing the Spartan Statue and finally into the stadium. The sidewalks are lined with fans applauding and cheering "Go Green, Go White."
- "Zeke the Wonder Dog" – East Lansing's favorite frisbee-catching dog, debuting in 1977 and reemerging as a tradition in 2001. Tryouts for a replacement are held when Zeke becomes unable to wow spectators at halftime.
- "It's a beautiful day for football!" – Just before kickoff, the PA announcer gives the weather forecast and, with the help of the fans, declares that "it's a beautiful day for football!" This tradition takes place even during games played in poor weather.
- 300 – Introduced in 2007, clips from the movie 300 were added to the "Thunderstruck" introduction sequence. A clip of Spartan King Leonidas shouting, "Spartans! What is your profession?" is played whenever the opponent is in a third down situation. The crowd responds with an emphatic "Ha-Ooh! Ha-Ooh! Ha-Ooh!" while thrusting their fists in the air as if they were carrying spears like in the movie. This is very popular with the football team. On October 16, 2010, 300 star Gerard Butler attended the Spartans' homecoming game. At the beginning of the game Butler walked onto the field repeating the familiar call to fans.

== Notable games ==
- 1951 – v. Notre Dame – No. 5 ranked Michigan State blanks No. 11 ranked Notre Dame 35–0 before a national audience on NBC. The dominant victory propels Spartan football into the national spotlight.
- 1953 – v. Michigan – Michigan State defeats Michigan for the first time in Spartan Stadium history 14–6 earning MSU a co-Big Ten championship and a trip to the Rose Bowl.
- 1966 – v. Notre Dame – "Game of the Century" ending in 10–10 tie. ND was ranked No. 1 and MSU was ranked No. 2 for several weeks prior to the game.
- 1972 - v. Ohio State - unranked MSU (3–4–1) upset undefeated #4 ranked Ohio State, 19–12, spoiling the Buckeyes' hopes for an undefeated season and national title.
- 1974 – v. Ohio State – unranked MSU upset undefeated and No. 1 ranked Ohio State, 16–13, ruining the Buckeyes' national title hopes.
- 1987 - v. USC - On Labor Day night, unranked MSU knocks off #19 USC in a nationally televised season opener, 27–13. The Spartans would go on to win the Big Ten title and defeat USC in a rematch in the Rose Bowl, 20–17.
- 1987 – v. Michigan – Spartans defeat Michigan 17–11 for their first victory over the Wolverines in East Lansing since 1969.
- 1987 – v. Indiana – MSU defeated Indiana 27–3 to win the Big Ten title and earned their first Rose Bowl bid since the 1965 season. Lorenzo White rushed for a then NCAA record tying 56 attempts for 292 yards (267 m).
- 1995 – v. Michigan – Tony Banks led an 88-yard (80 m) drive and threw the winning touchdown to Nigea Carter with 1:24 left in the game to win 28–25 over No. 7 ranked Michigan.
- 1998 – v. Notre Dame – before a national ABC prime time audience the Spartans jumped out to a 42–3 halftime lead en route to a 45–23 win.
- 2000 – v. Notre Dame – Wide receiver Herb Haygood catches a 68-yard touchdown pass on 4th down late in the 4th quarter, lifting the (#20) Spartans past (#18) Notre Dame.
- 2001 – v. Michigan – Quarterback Jeff Smoker finds T. J. Duckett in the end zone on fourth down on the final play of the game in a 26–24 victory. A timekeeper controversy resulted in the game being named clockgate.
- 2004 – v. Wisconsin – Michigan State executed 2 fourth down goal line stands, and two 99-yard touchdown drives, to stun the 9–0 (#5) Badgers 49–14, ending their hopes of a national championship. The victory marked the 300th win at Spartan Stadium.
- 2007 – v. Penn State – Halfback Jehuu Caulcrick leads Spartans from a 17-point deficit to a 35–31 victory. MSU scored on 4 of 5 second half possessions, ensuring a trip to their first bowl game since 2003.
- 2009 – v. Michigan – The Wolverines scored two late touchdowns to force overtime, the second with 2 seconds left in the fourth quarter. After Wolverine quarterback Tate Forcier was intercepted on Michigan's overtime possession, Spartan running back Larry Caper rushed 23 yards for a touchdown to lead Michigan State to 26–20 victory.
- 2010 – v. Notre Dame – Michigan State wins 34–31 when punter Aaron Bates threw to tight end Charlie Gantt on a fake field goal for the game-winning touchdown in overtime. The play was named "Little Giants."
- 2010 - v. Purdue - Trailing 28–13 after 3 quarters, the Spartans scored 22 points in the 4th quarter to beat the Boilermakers 35–31 and finish the season undefeated at home, with an 11–1 overall record.
- 2011 - v. Wisconsin - Keith Nichol catches a 44-yard Hail Mary pass from Kirk Cousins as time expires to defeat the undefeated and #5 ranked Badgers 37–31.
- 2013 - v. Michigan - Michigan State defeated Michigan 29–6, in which the Spartans defense handed the Wolverines their worst rushing yardage (-48) in school history.
- 2015 - v. Oregon - In the first Top 10 matchup at Spartan Stadium since 1966, the fifth ranked Spartans prevailed in a classic, 31–28. This game saw the fans "Stripe the Stadium" and surpass capacity, having over 76,500 fans in attendance. The win gave MSU their 5th win in last 6 attempts vs. Top 10 teams.
- 2021 - v. Michigan - The Spartans played their arch-rivals in the first Top 10 matchup between the teams since 1964. Michigan State, projected to finish last in the Big Ten East in the preseason voting, was ranked 8th in the country and tied for first place in the Big Ten East. The Spartans had a 16-point comeback led by Heisman Trophy candidate, running back Kenneth Walker III, who ended the game with 5 touchdowns and 197 yards. MSU won 37–33, advancing the series to 10–4 since Mike Hart called the Spartans “little brother” and also made head coach Mel Tucker the first coach in school history to start 2–0 against Michigan during his career. This win allowed the team to reach 8–0 for the first time since 2015, when they won the Big Ten title and made the College Football Playoff. The stadium had over 76,500 attendees.

== Gallery ==
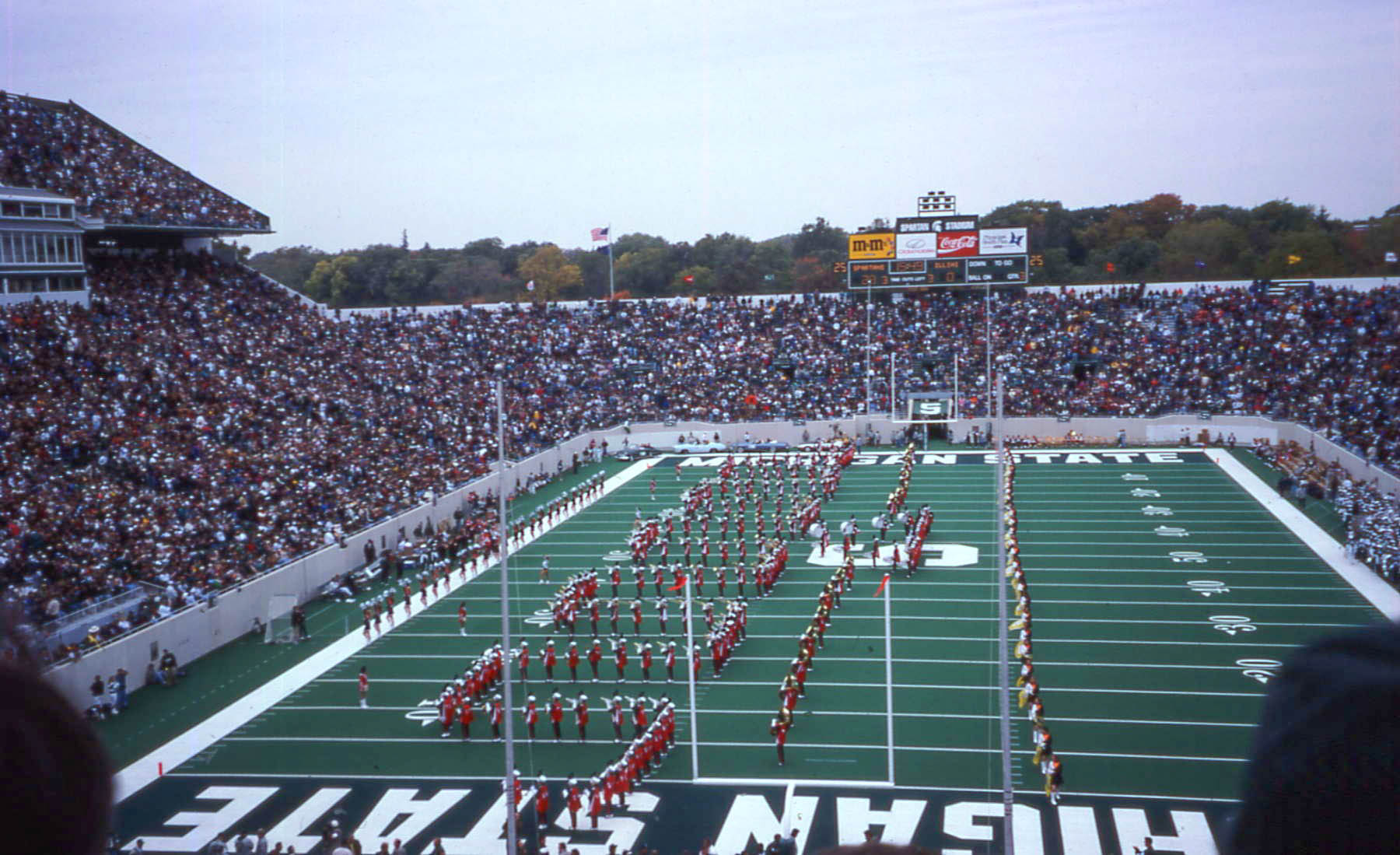
During a game in 1996

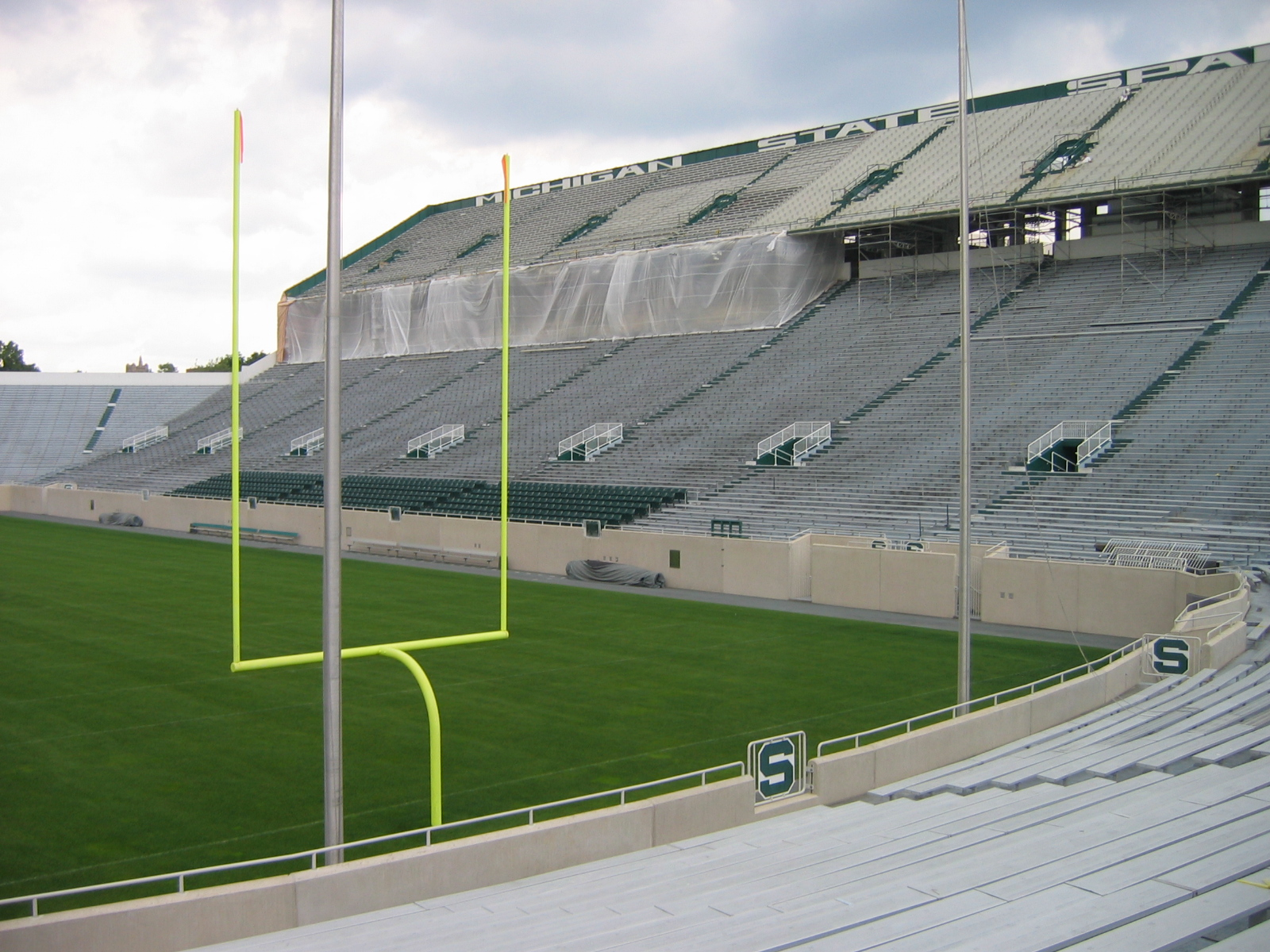
Goal line and post

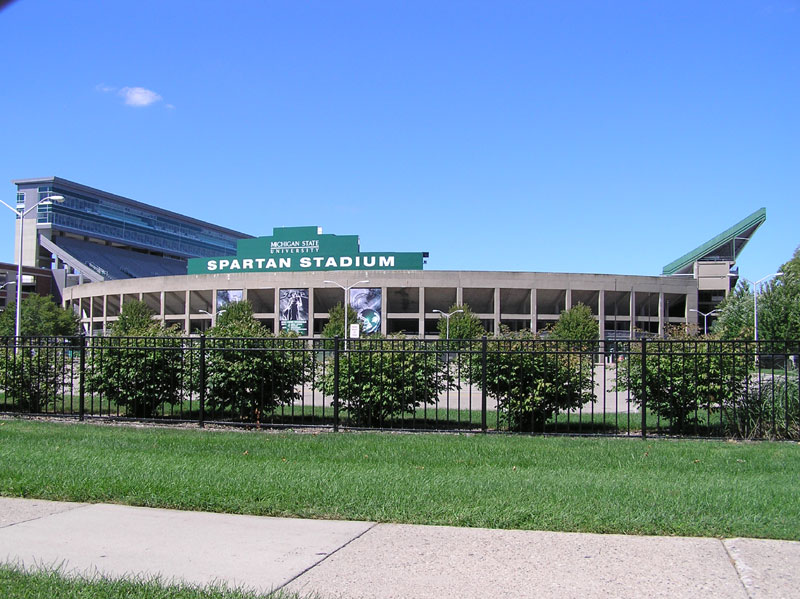
Exterior view

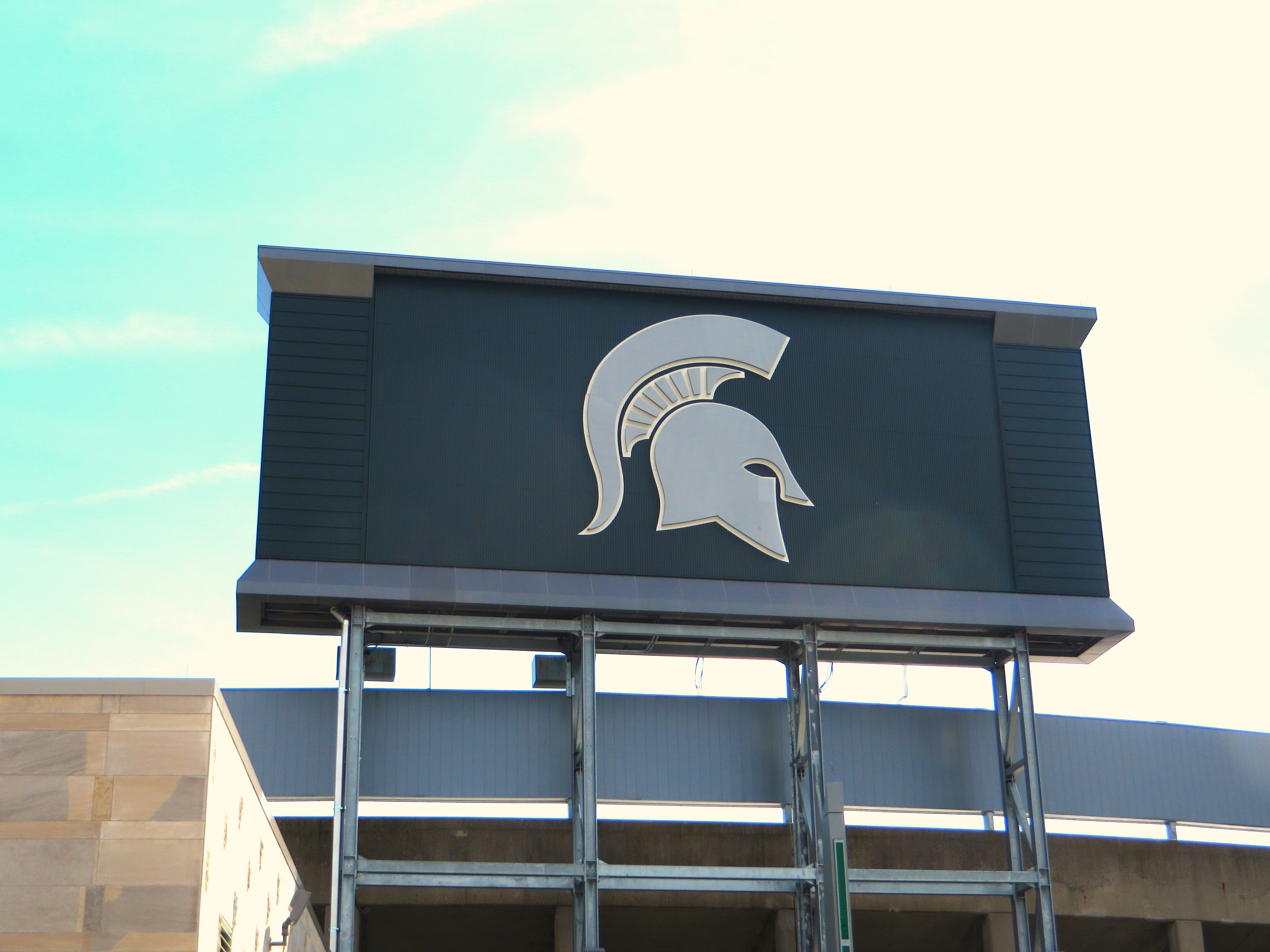
Spartan logo

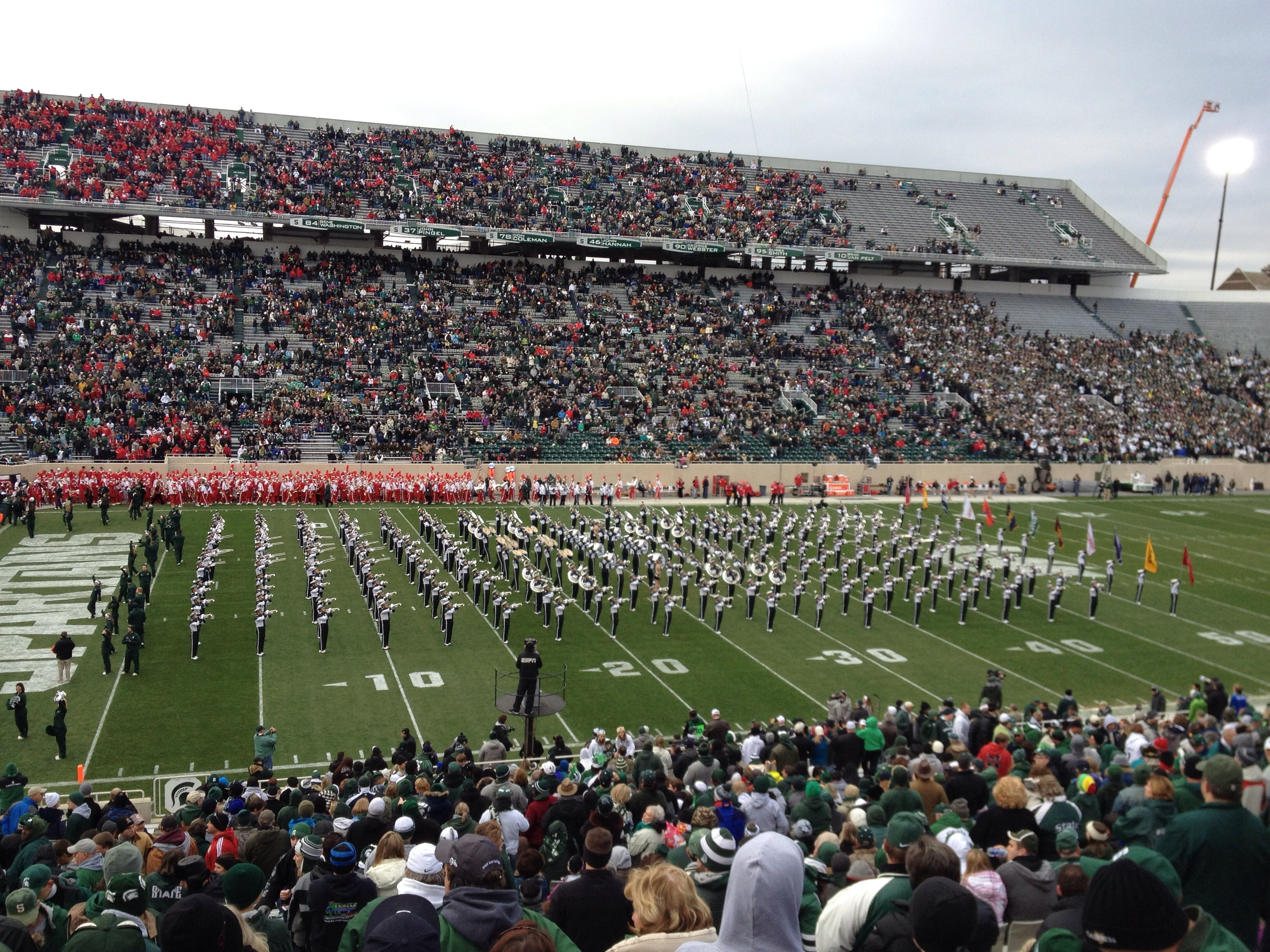
Michigan State v Nebraska in 2012

== See also ==
- List of NCAA Division I FBS football stadiums
- Lists of stadiums
