= Michigan School for the Blind =

Historic place in Lansing, Michigan, USA

- U.S. National Register of Historic Places
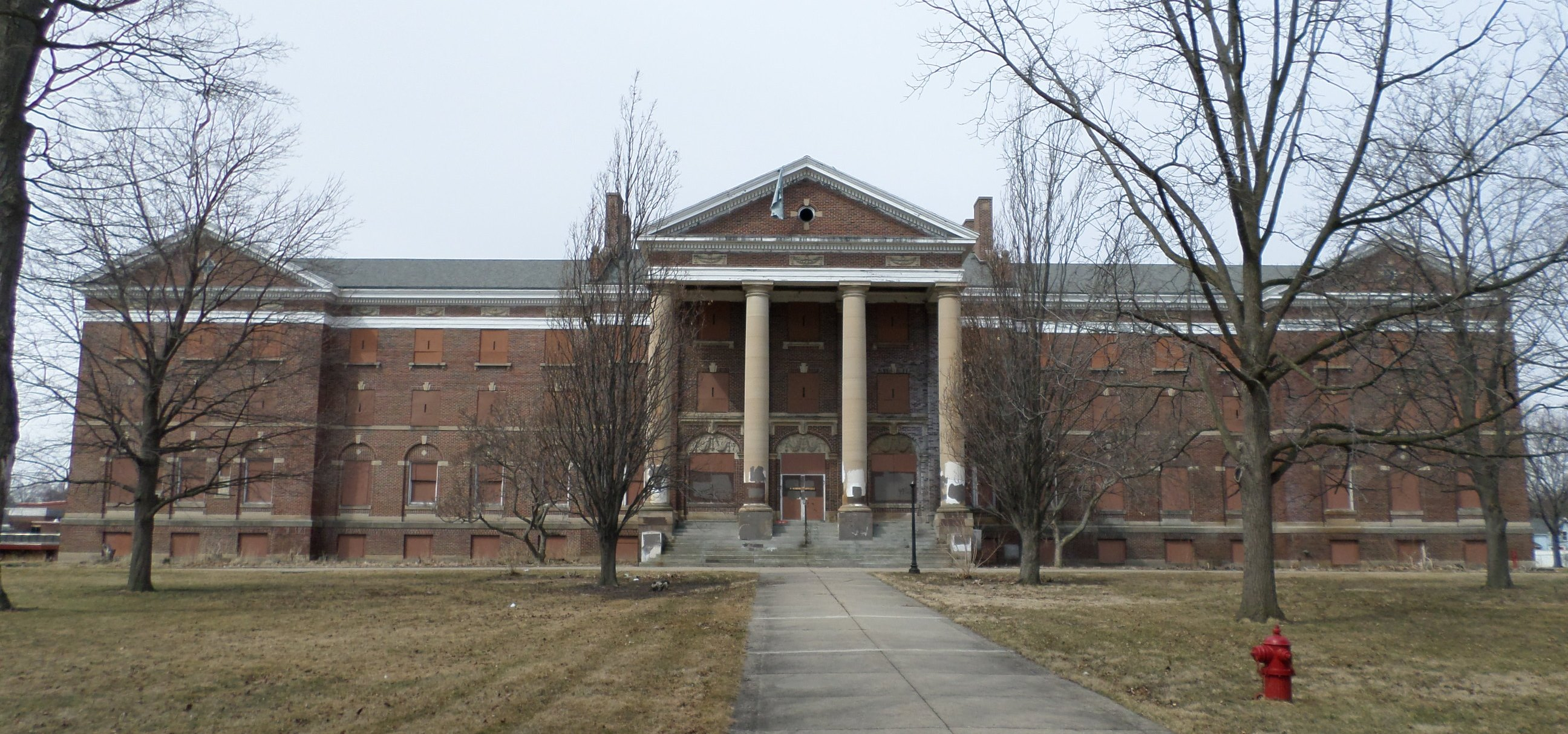
- Old Main (The Abigail)
- Interactive map
- Location: 715 W. Willow St., Lansing, Michigan, United States
- Coordinates: 42°44′51″N 84°33′44″W
- Built: 1912
- Architect: Edwyn A. Bowd
- Architectural style: Neoclassical
- NRHP reference No.: 100002714
- Added to NRHP: July 26, 2018

The Michigan School for the Blind (MSB) was a state-operated school for blind children in Michigan, United States.

Its former academic campus is at 715 W. Willow Street in Lansing, Michigan, and is now The Abigail, a senior apartment complex. The building was listed on the National Register of Historic Places in 2018. For other portions of its history the school was in Flint.

== History ==
In 1855, Abigail Rogers and Delia Rogers founded the Michigan Female College, constructing a campus in Lansing at this site. State colleges began admitting women in 1869, eliminating the need for a Female College and the institution was closed. The building spent a brief time as an Oddfellows Hall. By 1879, the Michigan School for the Blind and Deaf, then located in Flint, Michigan, needed a second campus for students with different needs. The former Michigan Female College became the Michigan School for the Blind.

Over time, the school required more space. In the 1910s, the school hired architect Edwyn Bowd to design a new high school (constructed in 1912), a superintendent's house (constructed in 1914), and a new "Old Main" building (also called the Abigail), which was constructed in 1915. Older buildings were eventually demolished, leaving these as the oldest structures on the campus.

By the 1970s, attendance at the school was declining. In 1994 the Lansing campus was closed. The school for the blind merged with the Michigan School for the Deaf in Flint, and the blind students moved to Flint in 1995. By 2005 there were no blind children on the school campus; instead area school districts educated blind children. To do this, the school for the blind focused on outreach services. It was renamed the Michigan Department of Education Low Incidence Outreach (MDE-LIO) in 2006.

The campus was sold to the Lansing Housing Commission. Redevelopment was slow and the campus was refurbished piecemeal. The main section of the campus, including the high school and the Abigail, was purchased by a developer, with a plan to renovate them into housing units announced in 2016. The first phase was completed in 2018. Residents had a positive reception to the redevelopment as the campus was previously in a poor condition. Further restoration began in 2019, and was completed in 2021, turning two buildings into 60 affordable apartments for seniors.

== Description ==
=== Lansing campus ===
Three buildings on campus were constructed before 1950. The first of these is the c. 1910 high school, a rectangular three-story structure with a flat roof. The raised basement and central entrance surround are constructed of limestone. The second building is the c. 1914 superintendent's residence, a 2 1/2-story Colonial Revival house with a steep hip roof and hipped dormer. A side entrance is sheltered by a full-width hipped roof porch. The third building is the Administration Building (Old Main). It is a three-story Neoclassical structure built from brick and limestone. It is an E-shaped structure, and has been enlarged several times. A central three-story portico is supported by four Doric columns with a pediment above.

The campus of the former school is located on 35 acres (14 ha) of land.

=== Flint campus ===
The Flint campus had dormitories for the students, with a dormitory for blind students beginning construction in 1998.

== Notable alumni ==
- Robert Mahoney, first blind member of the Michigan House of Representatives
- Doug Spade, member of the Michigan House of Representatives
- Stevie Wonder, attended under name of Stevland Morris, singer, songwriter, musician, and record producer
- George Wurtzel, artist, craftsman, and blind woodworking instructor
