= Ottawa Street Power Station =

Coordinates: 42°44′07″N 84°33′00″W

- U.S. National Register of Historic Places
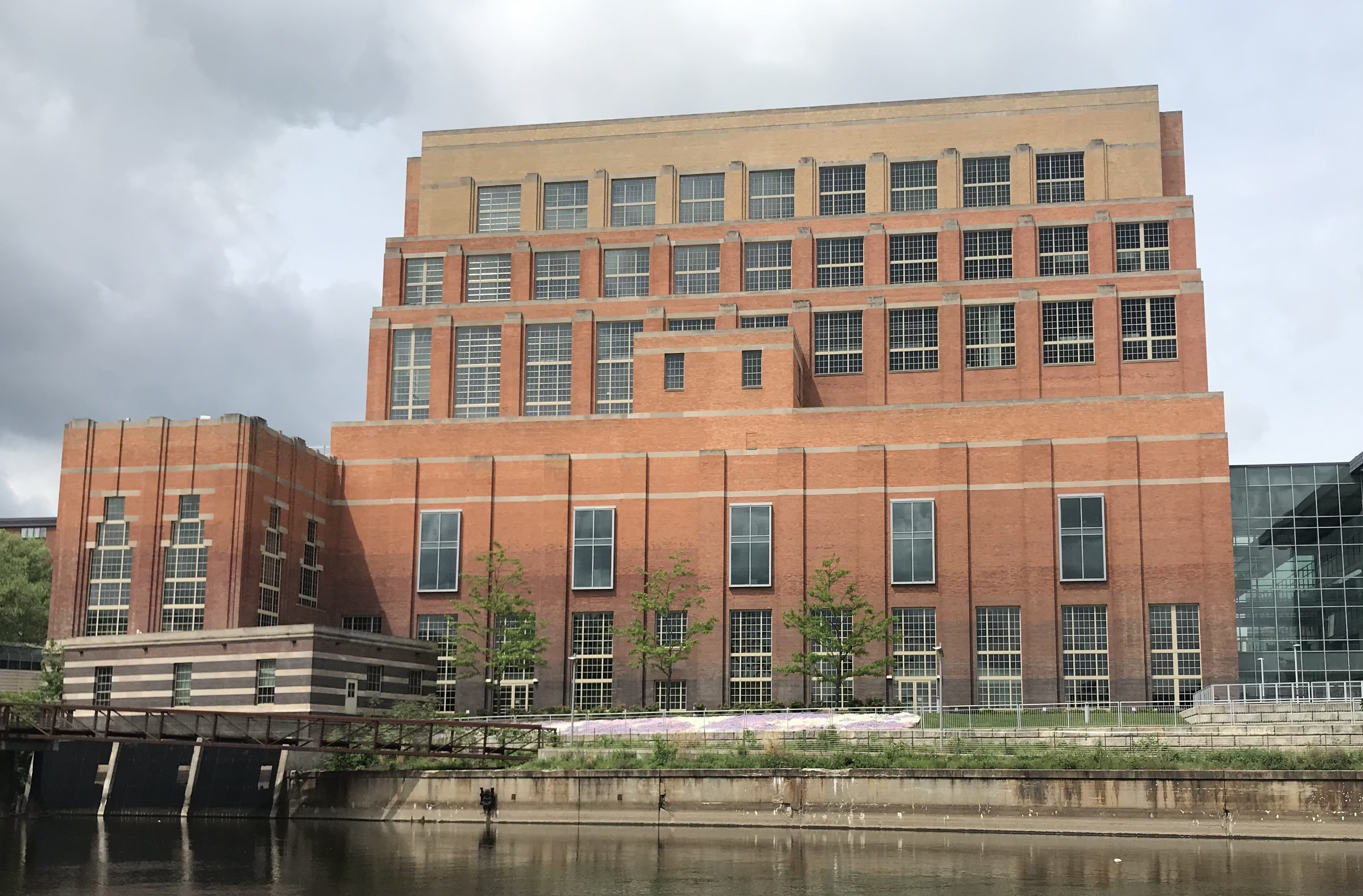
- View from across the Grand River, 2022
- Interactive map of Ottawa Street Power Station
- Area: 1.35 acres (5,500 m^{2})
- Built: 1937-1939
- Architect: Burns & Roe; Bowd–Munson Company
- Architectural style: Art Deco
- NRHP reference No.: 08001103
- Added to NRHP: November 26, 2008

The Ottawa Street Power Station is a historic electric and steam power station in Lansing, Michigan. The power station was built for the Lansing Board of Water and Light in the late 1930s, with engineering design by Burns and Roe and Art Deco architectural design by the Bowd–Munson Company. The plant generated electricity and steam until 1992, and saw a brief period of use as a chilled water plant in the early 2000s. The building's design and location in Downtown Lansing made it a candidate for adaptive reuse, and it was remodeled into offices for the Accident Fund Insurance Company of America in the early 2010s.

== Design and construction ==
The engineering design of the plant was by Ralph C. Roe and Allen Burns of the firm of Burns and Roe, and represented an improvement over the design of the Bremo Station in Virginia, which the two had designed while employed at Electric Management and Engineering Company. The architectural design was by Edwyn A. Bowd of Bowd and Munson. Construction began in 1937 and, due to material shortages caused by the outbreak of World War II, completed in two phases. The first phase, which consisted of the southern half of the building, was completed in 1939. The second phase was completed in 1946. In total, the project cost $4 million, all of it from ratepayers without the issuance of bonds or government funds.

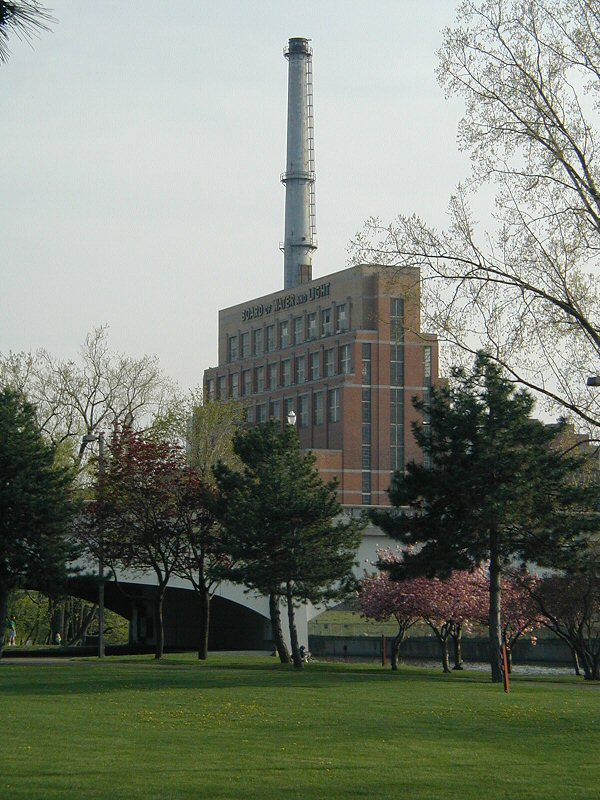

The 176-foot (54 m) tall Art Deco step-back structure sits on a polished black granite water table, with an intricate exterior design of multicolor brick. The design symbolizes the combustion of coal, and graduates from dark purple at the base through reds and orange in the middle, to light yellow at the top, alternating with bands of limestone, and with limestone parapets and trim. The Ottawa Street station was praised for its engineering and architecture in trade publications of the day, and immediately became the city's preeminent Art Deco landmark. Bowd subsequently designed a number of other prominent Art Deco and Streamline Moderne buildings in the Lansing area, including the J.W. Knapp Company Building.

== Operating history ==
The Ottawa Street station provided electricity and steam to the downtown Lansing area from 1939 through 1989. The plant had a generating capacity of 81,500-kilowatts. By 1971, improvements at the Board of Water and Light's Eckert Station permitted the Ottawa Street Station to operate as a backup station for electric generation. It continued to provide steam service into the 1980s. In 1984, the Board of Water and Light's Eckert Station began providing steam service, initially as a backup to the Ottawa Street Station, but eventually as the primary steam service source. As equipment became obsolete, it was removed from the Ottawa Street Station, and ultimately it was decommissioned in 1992 for electric and steam. In 2001, a portion of the station was renovated to provide chilled water service for air conditioning. It continued to operate as a water chilling plant until September 2009, when the Board of Water and Light completed a new chilled water plant in downtown Lansing.

== Redevelopment ==
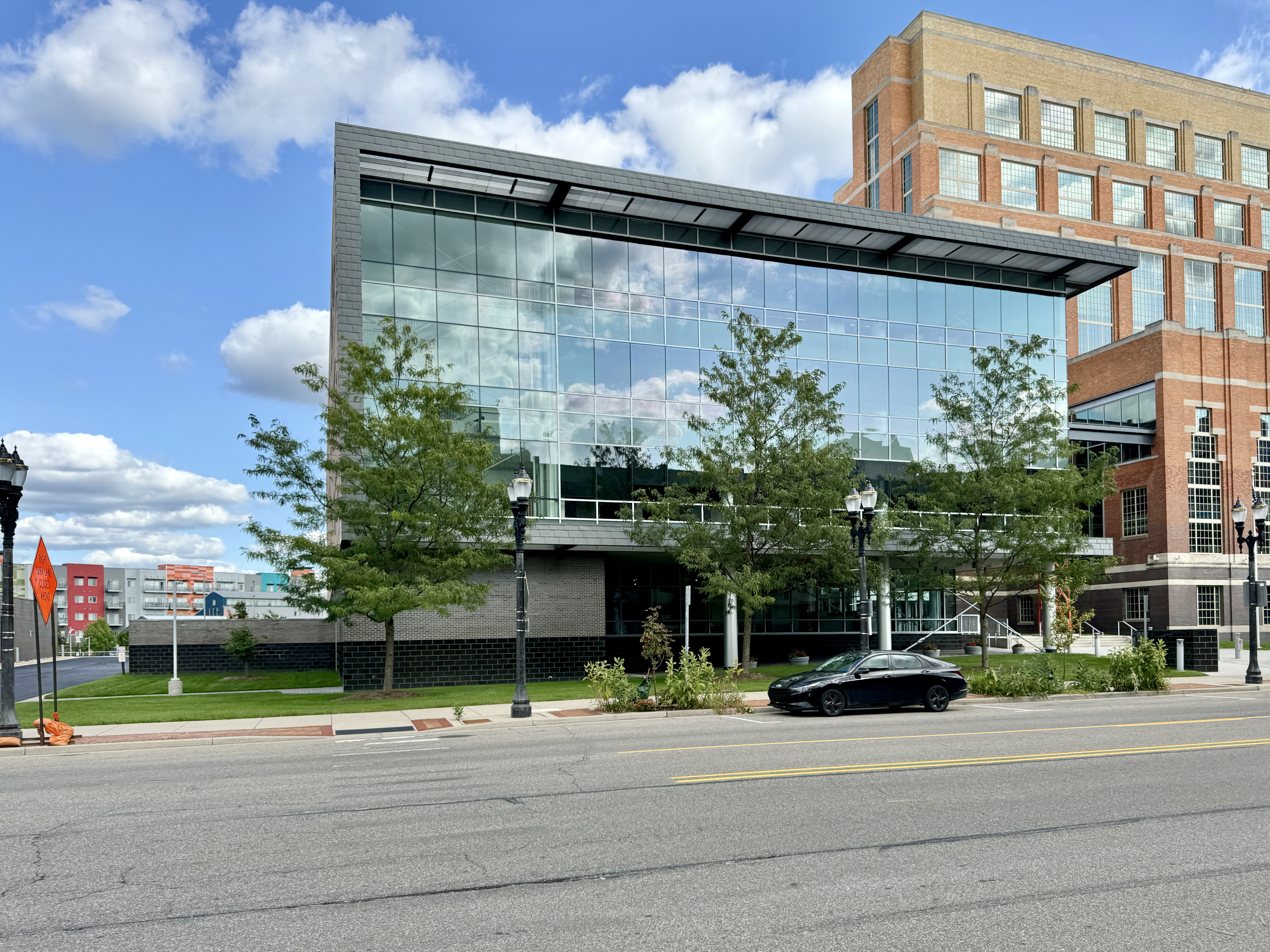
Following its redevelopment, the Ottawa Street Power Station now serves as part of a corporate campus for Accident Fund

Following decommissioning, the City of Lansing explored various options for redevelopment of the Ottawa Street Station. In 2007, it was sold to be redeveloped as corporate headquarters for the Accident Fund Insurance Company of America. Massive renovations to convert the plant to an office building with a 7-acre (28,000 m^{2}) campus were made over a two-year period by The Christman Company, and completed in the first quarter of 2011.

The redevelopment project won numerous awards, including:

- Richard H. Driehaus National Preservation Honor Award – National Trust for Historic Preservation
- Global Award for Excellence - Urban Land Institute
- Beyond Green High Performance Building First Place Honor Award for a Historic Reuse – National Institute of Building Sciences Sustainable Buildings Industry Council
- Governor's Award for Historic Preservation – Michigan State Housing Development Authority
- Design Award – Michigan Historic Preservation Network
- Construction and Design Award – Engineering Society of Detroit
- Green Project of the Year – Construction Association of Michigan
- Excellence in Economic Development – International Economic Development Council
- IDEAS2 Presidential Award of Excellence – American Institute of Steel Construction.

== National Register of Historic Places listing ==
The Ottawa Street Station was listed on the National Register of Historic Places on November 26, 2008.

It is the 22nd property listed as a featured property of the week in a program of the National Park Service that began in July 2008.

== See also ==
- National Register of Historic Places listings in Michigan
