= Charles E. Chamberlain Federal Building & Post Office =

- Federal Building
- U.S. National Register of Historic Places
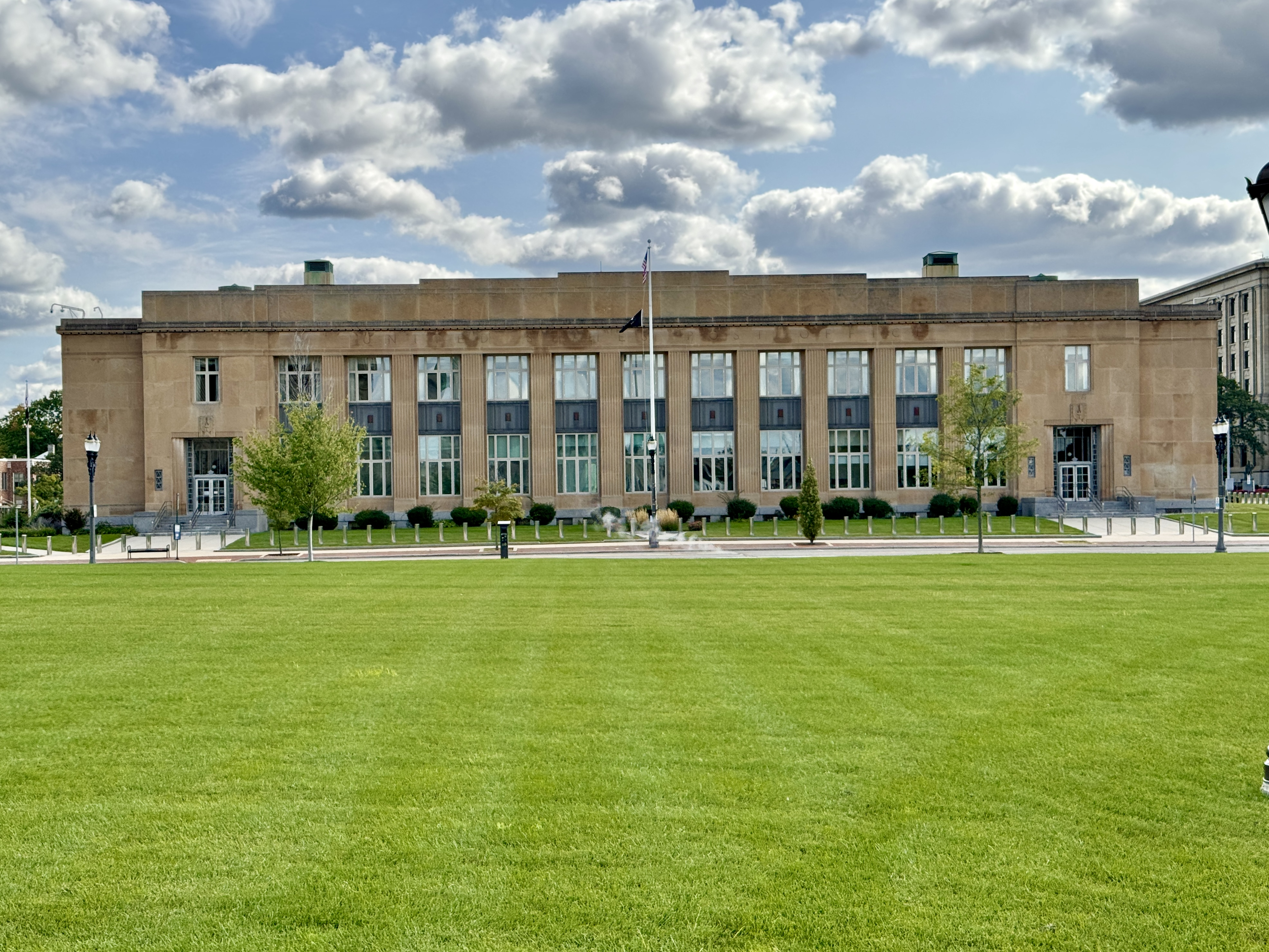
- Interactive map
- Location: 315 W. Allegan St., Lansing, Michigan
- Coordinates: 42°43′55″N 84°33′23″W
- Area: 3 acres (1.2 ha)
- Built: 1932
- Architect: Bowd-Munson Co.
- Architectural style: Classical Revival, Art Deco
- MPS: Downtown Lansing MRA
- NRHP reference No.: 80001865
- Added to NRHP: September 17, 1980

The Charles E. Chamberlain Federal Building & Post Office is a government building located at 315 West Allegan Street in Lansing, Michigan. It was listed on the National Register of Historic Places in 1980 as the Federal Building.

== History ==
An older Federal Building, constructed in 1895, was located in Lansing. Although this building was enlarged in 1913, by the 1930s the post office and various other federal agencies inhabiting it had outgrown the space. Recognizing the need, in 1932 the government hired architectural firm Bowd-Munson Company to design a new building. Construction began in 1932 and was completed in 1934. A rear addition to the building was constructed in 1960.

The building was acquired by the General Services Administration in 1976. In 1987, the United States Congress named the building for Charles E. Chamberlain, Michigan's 6th Congressional District Representative from 1957 to 1974. As of 2018, the major tenants of the building included the United States Postal Service, U.S. District Court, Court of Appeals, Bankruptcy Courts, and the Federal Highway Administration.

== Description ==
The Charles E. Chamberlain Federal Building & Post Office is a two-story, rectangular, Classical Revival structure of ochre limestone, with some Art Deco details. It measures 223 feet by 132 feet. The symmetrical facade consists of a broad center section with flanking entrance blocks. The center section contains two-story spandrelled window units separated by large fluted antae. The entry blocks contain recessed square-topped doorways with a stylized eagle in place of a keystone. A frieze and stepped parapet runs along the top of all three sections. The read, 1960 addition is simpler in design than the original building, but uses the same materials.

On the interior, the public lobby and entrance halls have walls of gold-flecked, grayish marble and with travertine and synthetic marble. The ceilings are divided into long recessed panels lined with fluorescent lighting fixtures of ribbed glass. The stair halls have metal grille doors and open staircases with grille-work rails.
