= List of people from South Carolina =

State flag of South Carolina

Location of South Carolina in the United States

The following is a list of prominent people who were born in the U.S. state of South Carolina, lived in South Carolina, or for whom South Carolina is a significant part of their identity.

== A–B ==
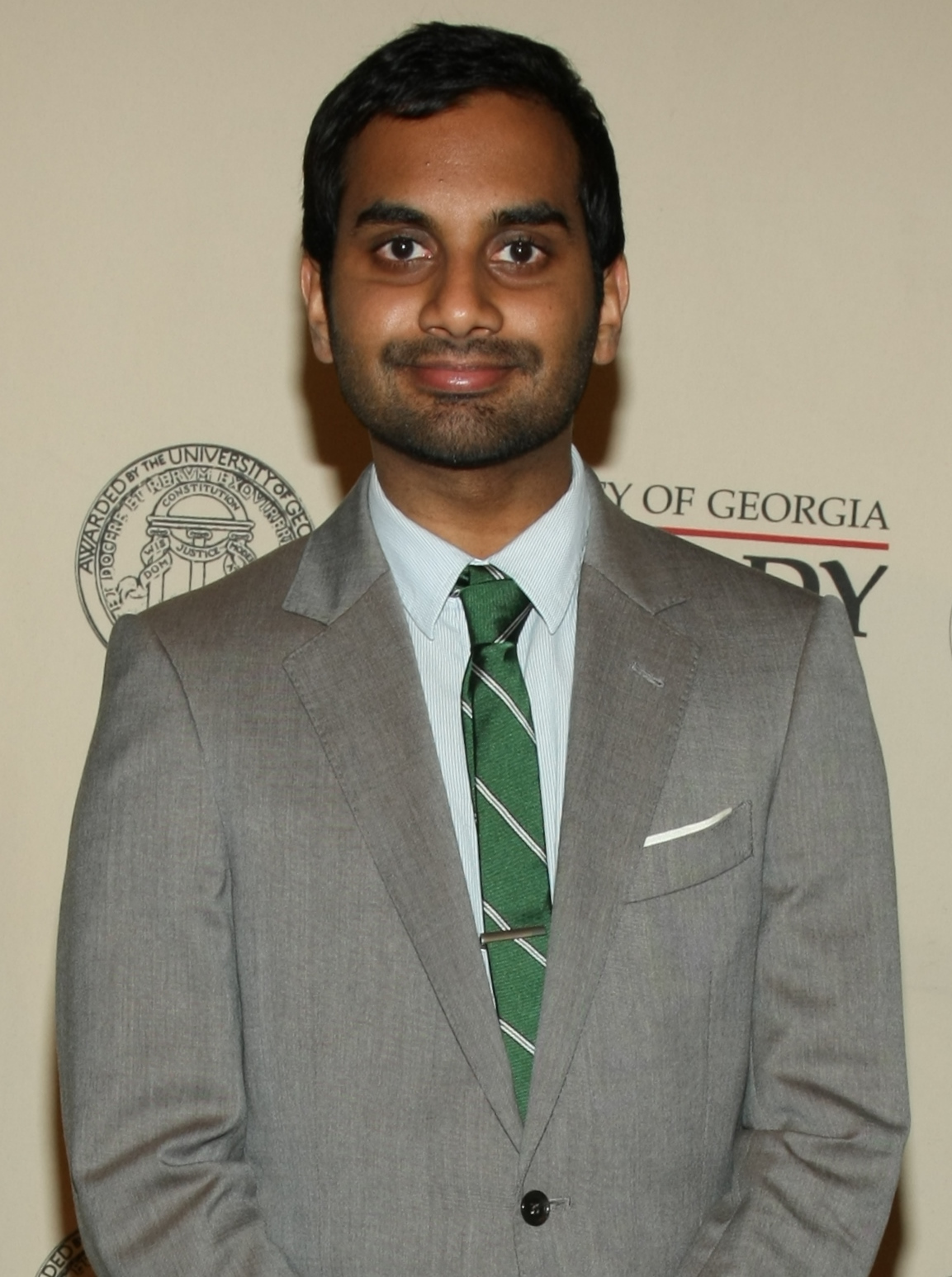
Aziz Ansari

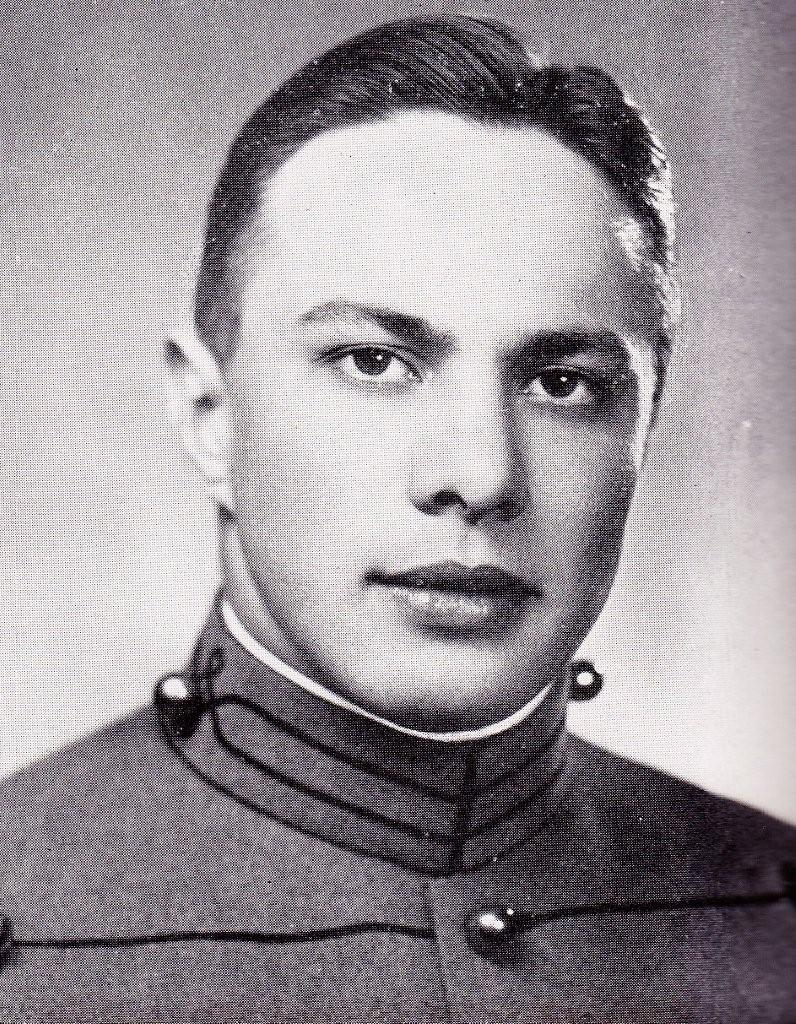
Doc Blanchard

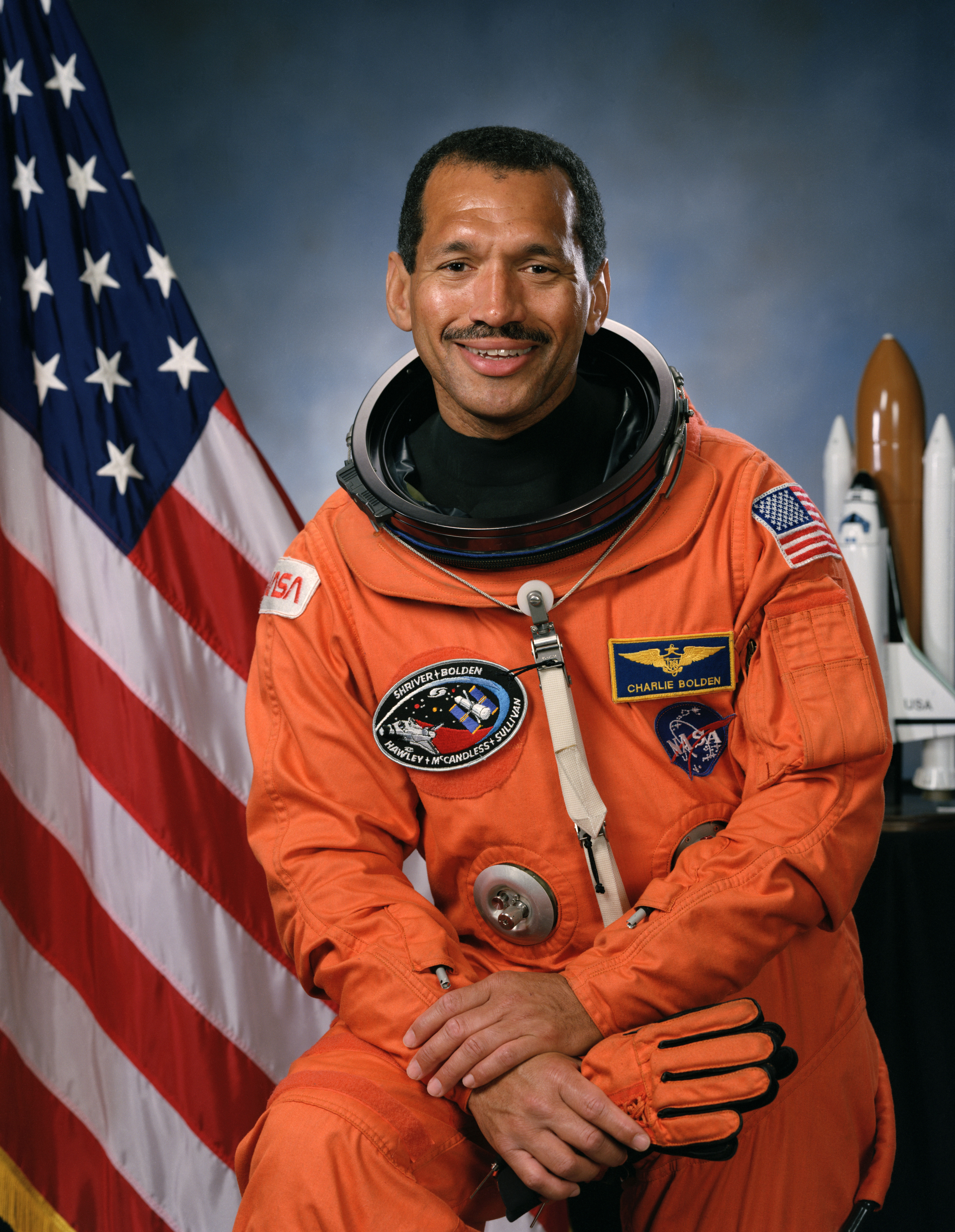
Charles Bolden

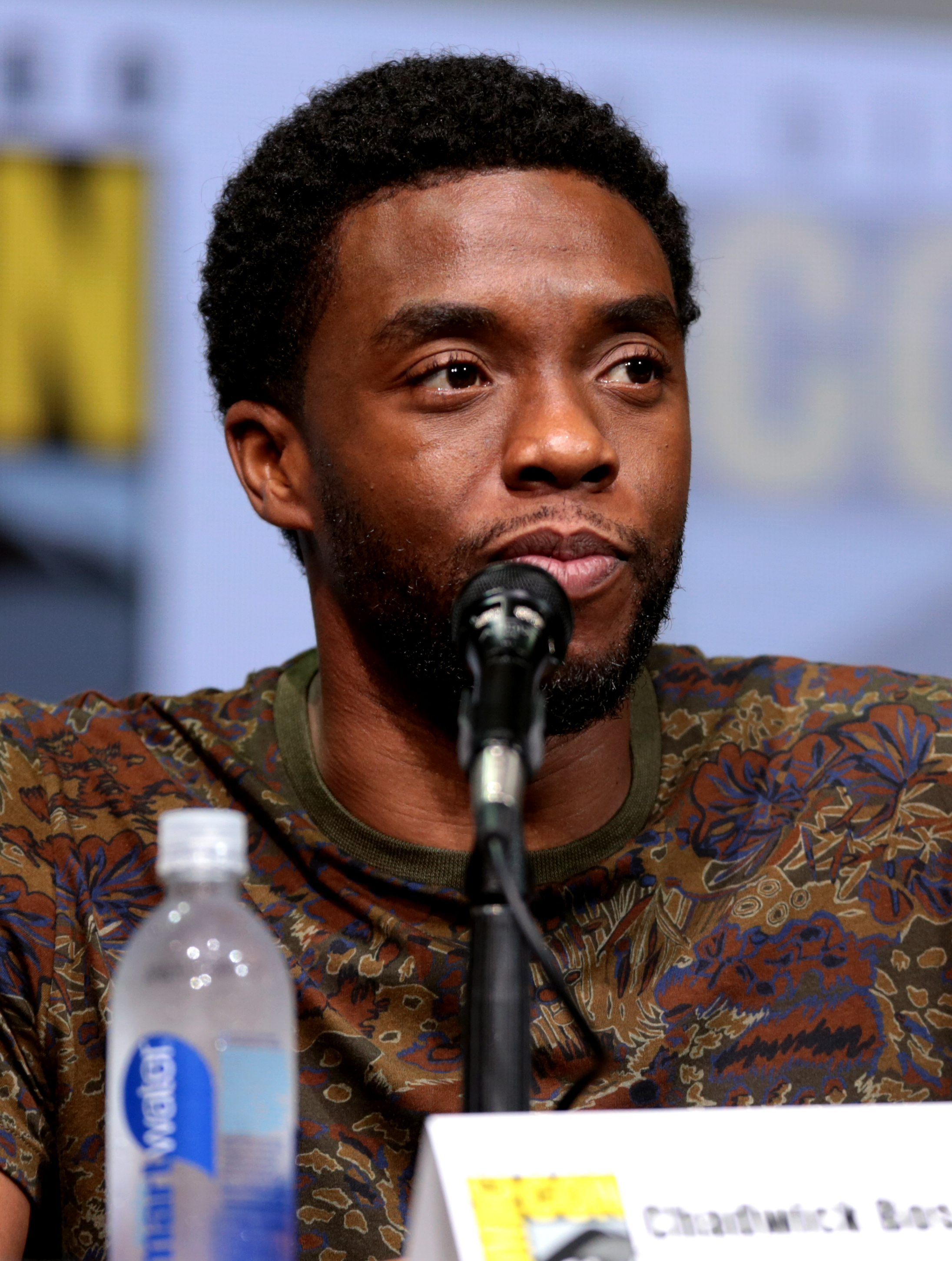
Chadwick Boseman

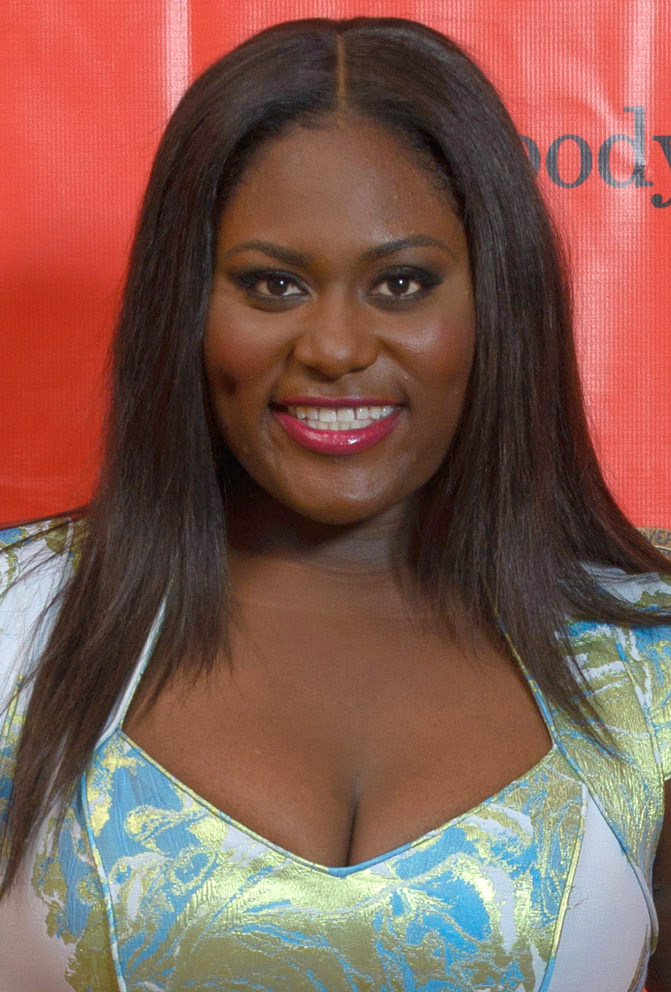
Danielle Brooks

- John Abraham (born 1978), born in Timmonsville; NFL defensive end for the Arizona Cardinals
- Rick Adair (born 1958), born in Spartanburg; pitching coach for the Baltimore Orioles
- Kimberly Aiken (born 1975), born in Columbia; Miss America 1994
- Jaimie Alexander (born 1984), born in Greenville; actress, Kyle XY, Blindspot, the Thor movies
- Ray Allen (born 1975), lived in Dalzell; NBA star for the Miami Heat
- Bill Anderson (born 1937), born in Columbia; country music singer and songwriter, nicknamed "Whisperin' Bill"
- Ike Anderson (born 1957), born in Columbia; Greco-Roman wrestler who competed at 1988 Summer Olympics
- Olanda Anderson (born 1972), born in Sumter; former boxer, member of the 2000 United States Olympics team
- Aziz Ansari (born 1983), born in Columbia; actor and comedian
- Norman C. Armitage (1907–1972), Olympic medalist saber fencer
- Robert Ayers (born 1985), raised in Clio; defensive end for the New York Giants
- Annie Maria Barnes (1857 – unknown), born in Columbia; journalist, editor, and author
- Alex Barron (born 1982), born in Orangeburg; left tackle for the Dallas Cowboys
- Frances Elizabeth Barrow (1822–1894), born in Charleston; children's writer
- Bernard Baruch (1870–1965), born in Camden; financier, philanthropist, statesman, and adviser to President Woodrow Wilson and Franklin Roosevelt
- Tyler Bass (born 1997), from Columbia; kicker for the Buffalo Bills
- Samuel Beam (born 1974), born in Columbia; singer-songwriter under the stage name Iron & Wine
- Paul Benjamin (1938–2019), born in Pelion; actor
- Shelton Benjamin (born 1976), from Orangeburg; professional wrestler and former amateur wrestler
- Charles Dantonja Bennett (born 1983), born in Camden; football player for Clemson University and Tampa Bay Buccaneers
- Ben Bernanke (born 1953), graduated from high school in Dillon in 1971, former chairman of the Federal Reserve
- The Big Show (born Paul Donald Wight), professional wrestler and actor, born in Aiken
- Blue Sky (born 1938), born in Columbia and lived there for the majority of his life, painter and sculptor
- Alfred W. Bethea (1916–1999), former member of the South Carolina House of Representatives from Dillon; the 1970 gubernatorial nominee of the American Independent Party
- Mary McLeod Bethune (1875–1955), from Mayesville; civil rights leader and groundbreaking educator
- Doc Blanchard (1924–2009), born in McColl, raised in Bishopville; college football player who became the first ever junior to win the Heisman Trophy
- Charles F. Bolden Jr. (born 1946), born in Columbia; NASA astronaut, United States Marine Corps major general, administrator of NASA
- James Butler Bonham (1807–1836), from Red Bank (now Saluda); lawyer, soldier, and defender of the Alamo
- Chadwick Boseman (1976–2020), born in Anderson; actor, known for his role as Black Panther in Captain America: Civil War and in the 2018 film of the same name
- Peter Boulware (born 1974), born in Columbia; former linebacker for the Baltimore Ravens
- Zackary Bowman (born 1984), born in Columbia; cornerback for the Chicago Bears
- Jarrell Brantley (born 1996), basketball player
- Rick Brewer, former administrator at Charleston Southern University in North Charleston, and current president of Louisiana College in Pineville, Louisiana
- Lee Brice (born 1980), born in Sumter; country artist, co-wrote the Garth Brooks song More Than a Memory
- Ben Bridwell (born 1978), from Irmo; lead singer of indie rock band Band of Horses
- Danielle Brooks (born 1989), raised in Simpsonville; actress
- Preston Brooks (1819–1857), born in Edgefield; advocate of slavery and states' rights before the American Civil War
- Robert Brooks (born 1970), born in Greenwood; former wide receiver for the Green Bay Packers and the Denver Broncos
- J. Anthony Brown, born in Columbia; actor, comedian and radio personality
- James Brown (1933–2006), born in Barnwell; singer, songwriter, musician, and recording artist dubbed the "godfather of soul"
- Kwame Brown (born 1982), born in Charleston; center for the Golden State Warriors
- Omar Brown (born 1988), born in Moncks Corner; free safety for the Baltimore Ravens
- Troy Brown (born 1971), born in Barnwell, NFL wide receiver, won three Super Bowls with the New England Patriots
- Sheldon Brown (born 1979), born in Lancaster; cornerback for the Cleveland Browns
- Martavis Bryant (born 1991), born in Calhoun Falls; wide receiver for the Pittsburgh Steelers
- Peabo Bryson (born 1951), born in Greenville; R&B singer-songwriter
- D.J. Burns (born 2000), basketball player in the Israeli Basketball Premier League
- Jared Burton (born 1981), born in Westminster; relief pitcher for the Minnesota Twins
- Rafael Bush (born 1987), born in Williston; safety for the New Orleans Saints
- James F. Byrnes (1882–1972), born in Charleston; U.S. representative, U.S. senator, justice of the Supreme Court, secretary of state, and 104th governor of South Carolina

== C–D ==
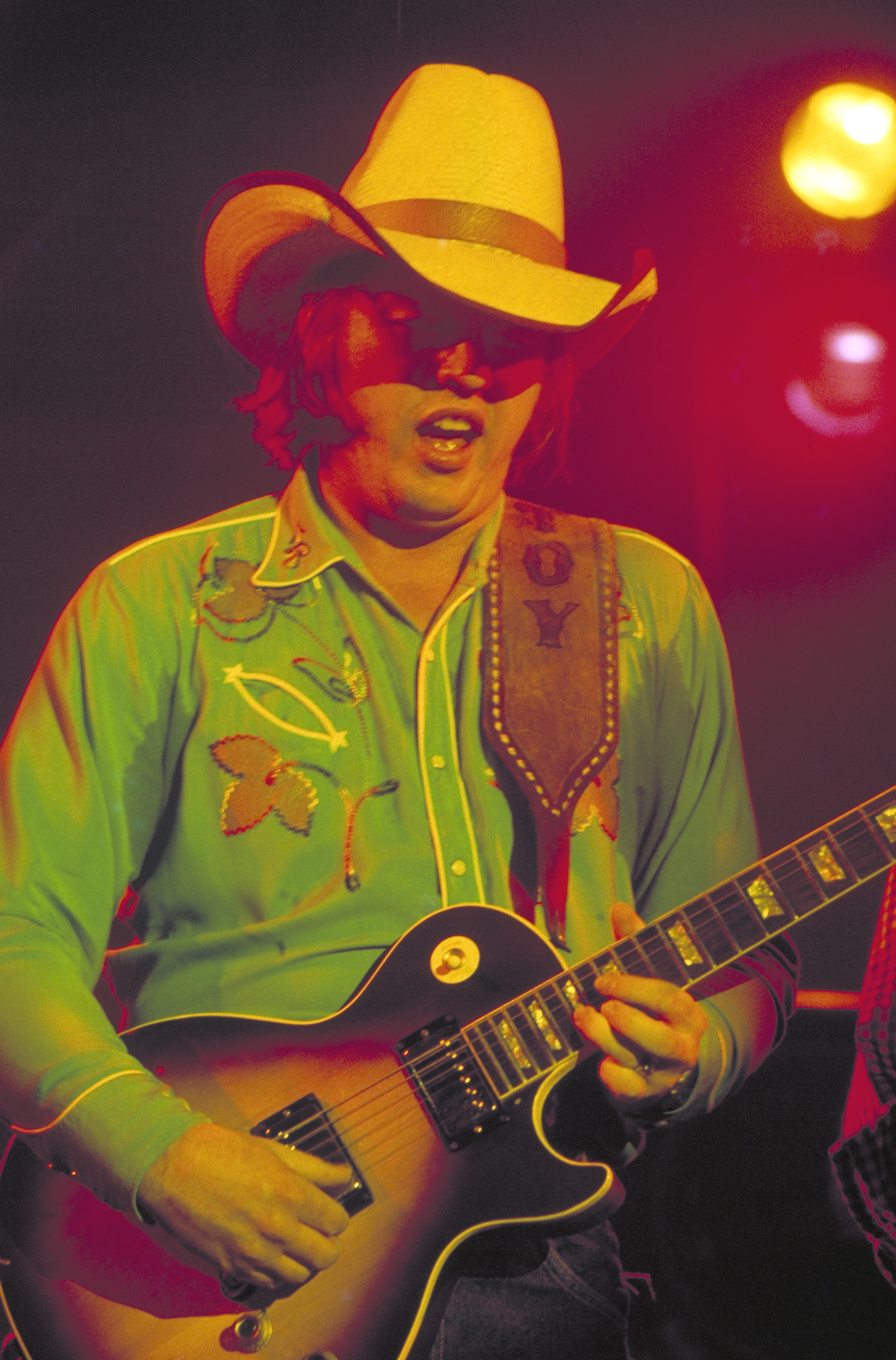
Toy Caldwell

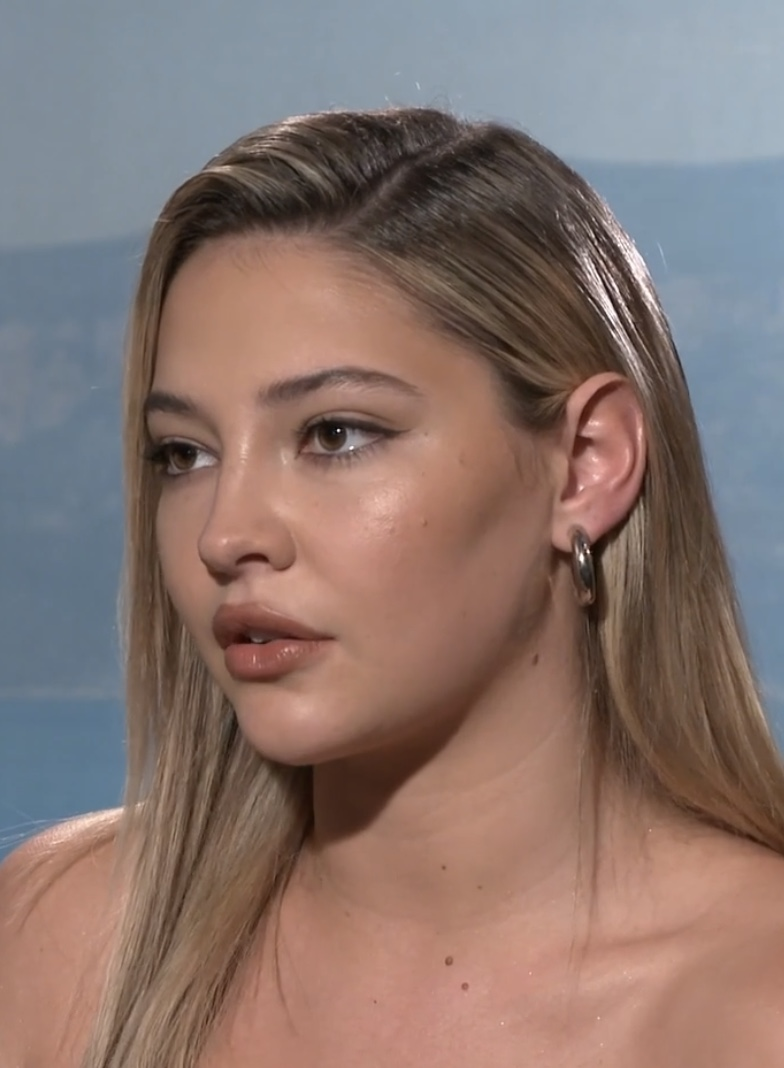
Madelyn Cline

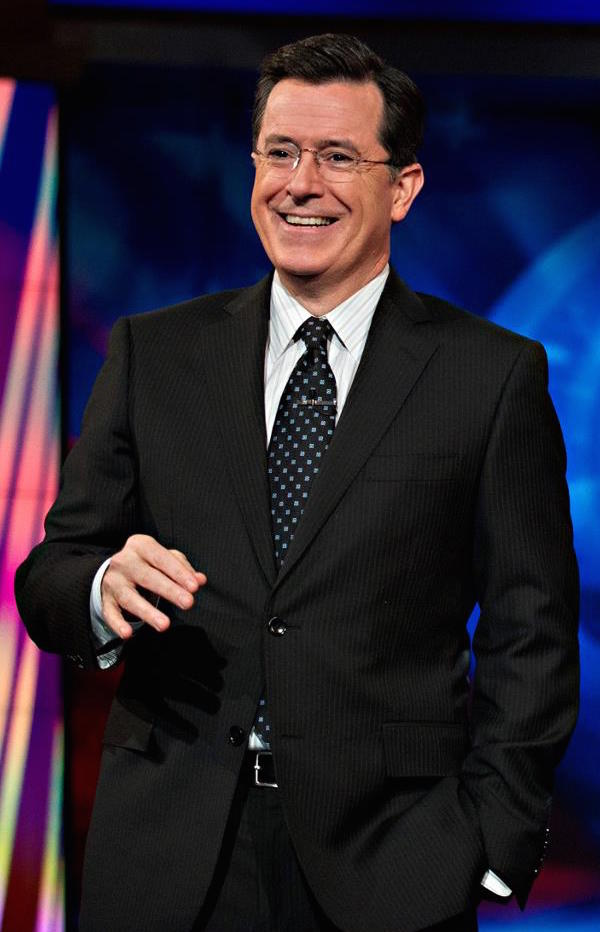
Stephen Colbert

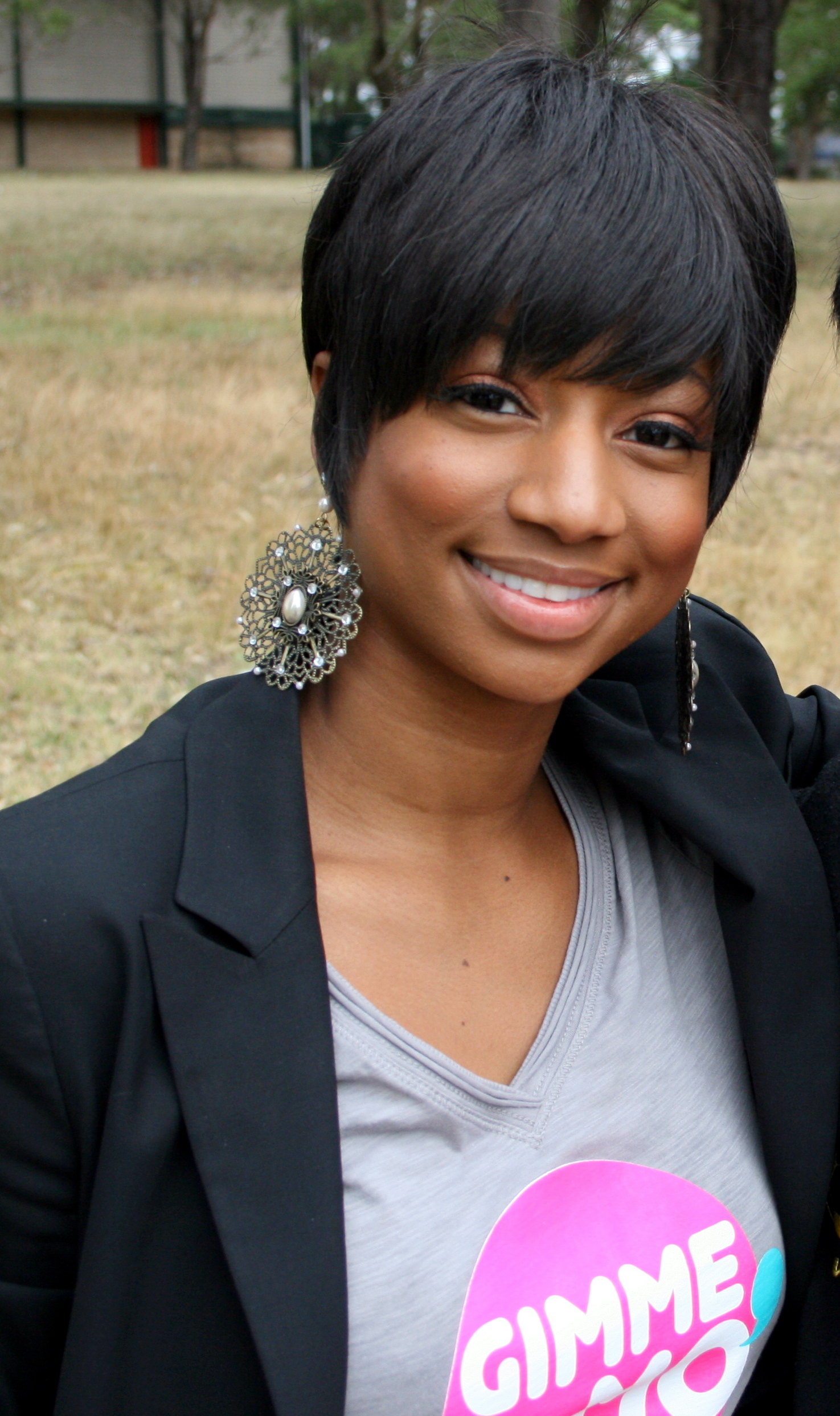
Monique Coleman

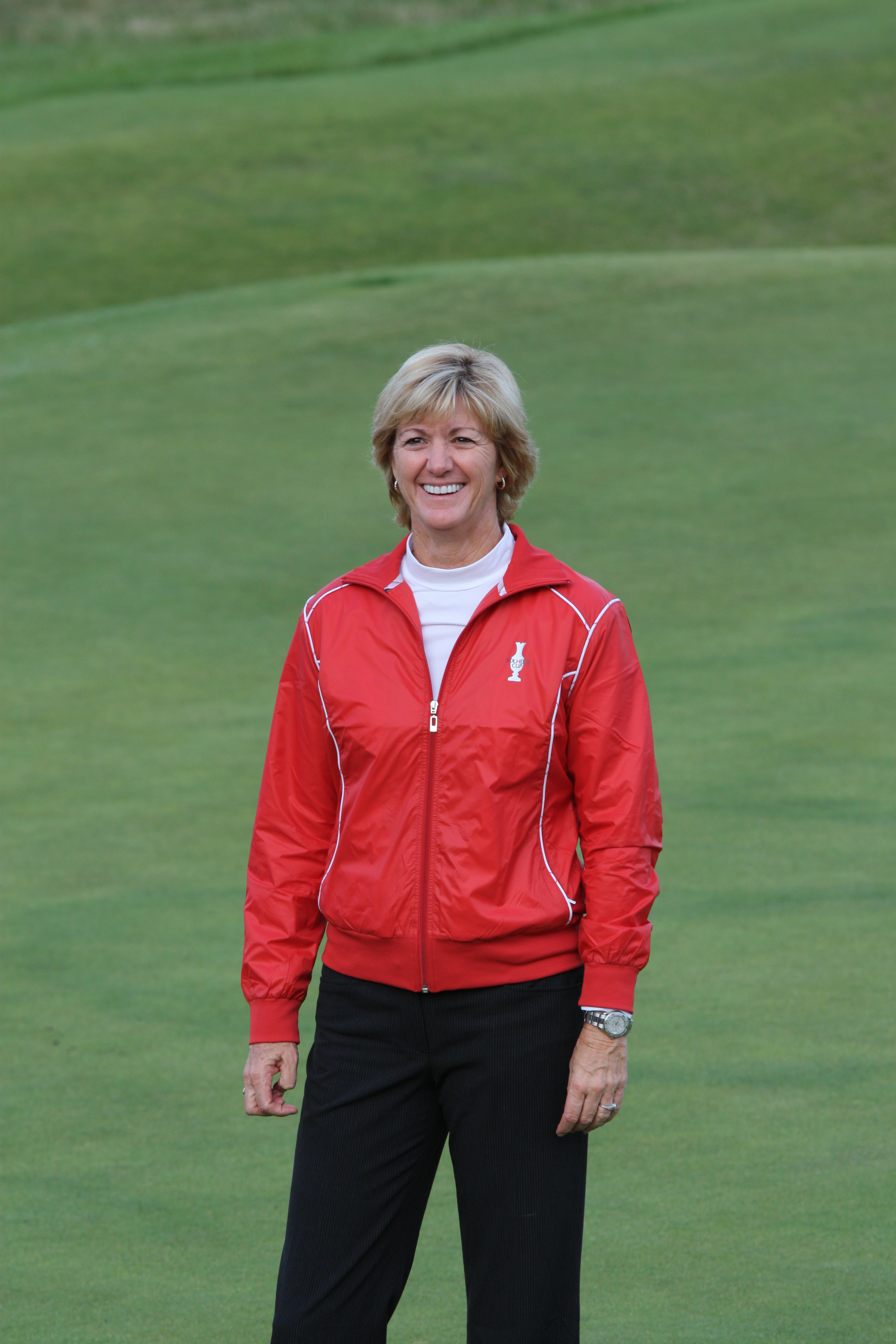
Beth Daniel

- Pat Caddell (1950–2019), born in Rock Hill; public opinion pollster, political film consultant
- Tommy Caldwell (1949–1980), born in Spartanburg; bassist for the Marshall Tucker Band
- Toy Caldwell (1947–1993), born in Spartanburg; lead guitarist and vocalist for the Marshall Tucker Band
- Floride Calhoun (1792–1866), born in Charleston; Second Lady of the United States
- John Caldwell Calhoun (1782–1850), born in Abbeville County; U.S. senator, secretary of state, secretary of war, and the 7th vice president of the U.S.
- Anna Camp (born 1982), born in Aiken; actress, The Help
- Carroll A. Campbell Jr. (1940–2005), born in Greenville; South Carolina governor and U.S. congressman
- John Tucker Campbell (1912–1991), born in Calhoun Falls; secretary of state 1978–1991, mayor of Columbia 1970–1978, city councilman, drugstore owner
- Marion Campbell (1929–2016), born in Chester; NFL defensive lineman and head coach
- Shane Carruth (born 1972), born in Myrtle Beach; filmmaker
- Harry Carson (born 1953), born in Florence; football player, inducted into the Pro Football Hall of Fame 2006
- Wilson Casey (born 1954), born in Woodruff; "Trivia" Guinness World Record holder, nationally syndicated trivia newspaper columnist
- Chandler Catanzaro (born 1991), born in Greenville; placekicker for the Arizona Cardinals
- Charlamagne Tha God (born 1980), born in Moncks Corner; radio and TV personality
- Essie B. Cheesborough (1826–1905), born in Charleston; writer
- Chubby Checker (born 1941 as Ernest Evans), born in Spring Gulley (Andrews); singer
- Alice Childress (1920–1994), born in Charleston; playwright who wrote about the struggles of poverty and racism
- Kelsey Chow (born 1991), born and raised in Columbia; actress
- Jim Clyburn (born 1940), born in Sumter; U.S. congressman
- Dave Cockrum (1943–2006), died in Belton; comic book artist
- Landon Cohen (born 1986), born in Spartanburg; defensive tackle for the Seattle Seahawks
- Stephen Colbert (born 1964), born in Washington, D.C. but grew up in Charleston; comedian, anchor, political analyst, television personality, former host of The Colbert Report and current host of the television show The Late Show with Stephen Colbert
- Catherine Coleman (born 1960), born in Charleston; chemist, former U.S. Air Force officer, current NASA astronaut
- Monique Coleman (born 1980), born in Orangeburg; actress
- Mike Colter (born 1976), born in Columbia, raised in St. Matthews; actor, Ringer
- O'Neal Compton (1951–2019), born in Sumter; character actor
- Pat Conroy (1945–2016), grew up in Beaufort, attended Beaufort High School and The Citadel; novelist
- Angell Conwell (born 1983), born in Orangeburg and raised in Columbia; actress
- Tyrone Corbin (born 1962), born in Columbia; NBA player and coach
- James S. Cothran (1830–1897), born in Abbeville County; U.S. House of Representatives for South Carolina's 3rd congressional district
- Torrey Craig (born 1990), born in Columbia; NBA player
- Charles Craven (1682–1754); governor of colonial South Carolina during the Tuscarora War and Yamasee War
- Shawn Crawford (born 1978), born in Van Wyck; gold medalist in 2004 Athens Olympics 200 meters, silver in 2008 Beijing Olympics
- Madelyn Cline (born 1997), born in Goose Creek; actress
- Esther Dale (1885–1961), born in Beaufort; actress
- Beth Daniel (born 1956), born in Charleston; golfer, member of World Golf Hall of Fame
- George B. Daniels (born 1953), born in Allendale; federal judge
- Gary Davis (1896–1972), born in Clinton; blues and gospel songwriter and innovative guitarist
- Kristin Davis (born 1965), early in her childhood, she and her parents moved to Columbia; actress known for role as Charlotte York in Sex and the City
- Mary Elizabeth Moragne Davis (1815–1903), born in Oakwood, Abbeville District; diarist and author
- Mendel Jackson Davis (1942–2007), born in North Charleston; United States representative from South Carolina
- Richard C. Davis (born 1963), from Charleston; real estate broker and television personality
- Viola Davis (born 1965), born in St. Matthews; actress, The Help
- Katon Dawson (born 1956), born in Columbia; former chairman of the South Carolina Republican Party
- Manish Dayal (born 1983), born in Orangeburg; actor, 90210
- Robert C. De Large (1842–1874), born in Aiken; member of United States House of Representatives from South Carolina
- Justin Dean (born 1996), born in Mauldin; professional baseball player for the Los Angeles Dodgers
- Will Demps (born 1963), born in Charleston; football safety for the Baltimore Ravens and others
- Andy Dick (born 1965), born in Charleston; actor and comedian best known for his roles on sitcoms
- James Dickey (1923–1997); professor at University of South Carolina at Columbia, poet and novelist
- Samuel Henry Dickson (1798–1872), born in Charleston; poet, physician, writer and educator
- Anna Peyre Dinnies (1805–1886), born in Georgetown; poet and writer
- Julius Dixson (1913–2004), born in Barnwell; songwriter and record company executive
- Larry Doby (1923–2003), born in Camden; baseball player in Negro leagues and Major League Baseball, first black player in American League, later manager of Chicago White Sox, Hall of Fame inductee
- Stanley Donen (1924–2019), born in Columbia; film director and choreographer
- Ulysses Dove (1947–1996), born in Columbia; choreographer
- David Drake (c.1800–c.1870s), from Edgefield; potter
- Steven Duggar (born 1993), born in Spartanburg and raised in Moore; baseball player for the San Francisco Giants
- Charles Duke (born 1935), raised in Lancaster; engineer, retired U.S. Air Force officer, test pilot, former astronaut
- Watson B. Duncan III (1915–1991), born in Charleston; college professor
- William Wallace Duncan (1839–1908), died in Spartanburg; bishop of the Methodist Episcopal Church, South
- Justin Durant (born 1985), born in Florence; linebacker for the Atlanta Falcons

== E–F ==
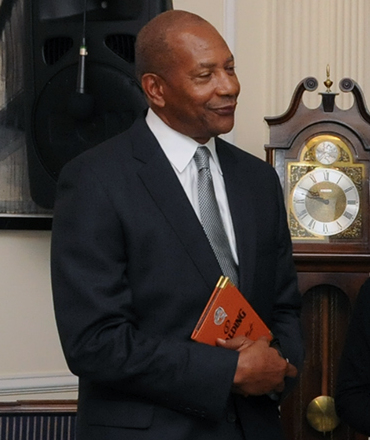
Alex English

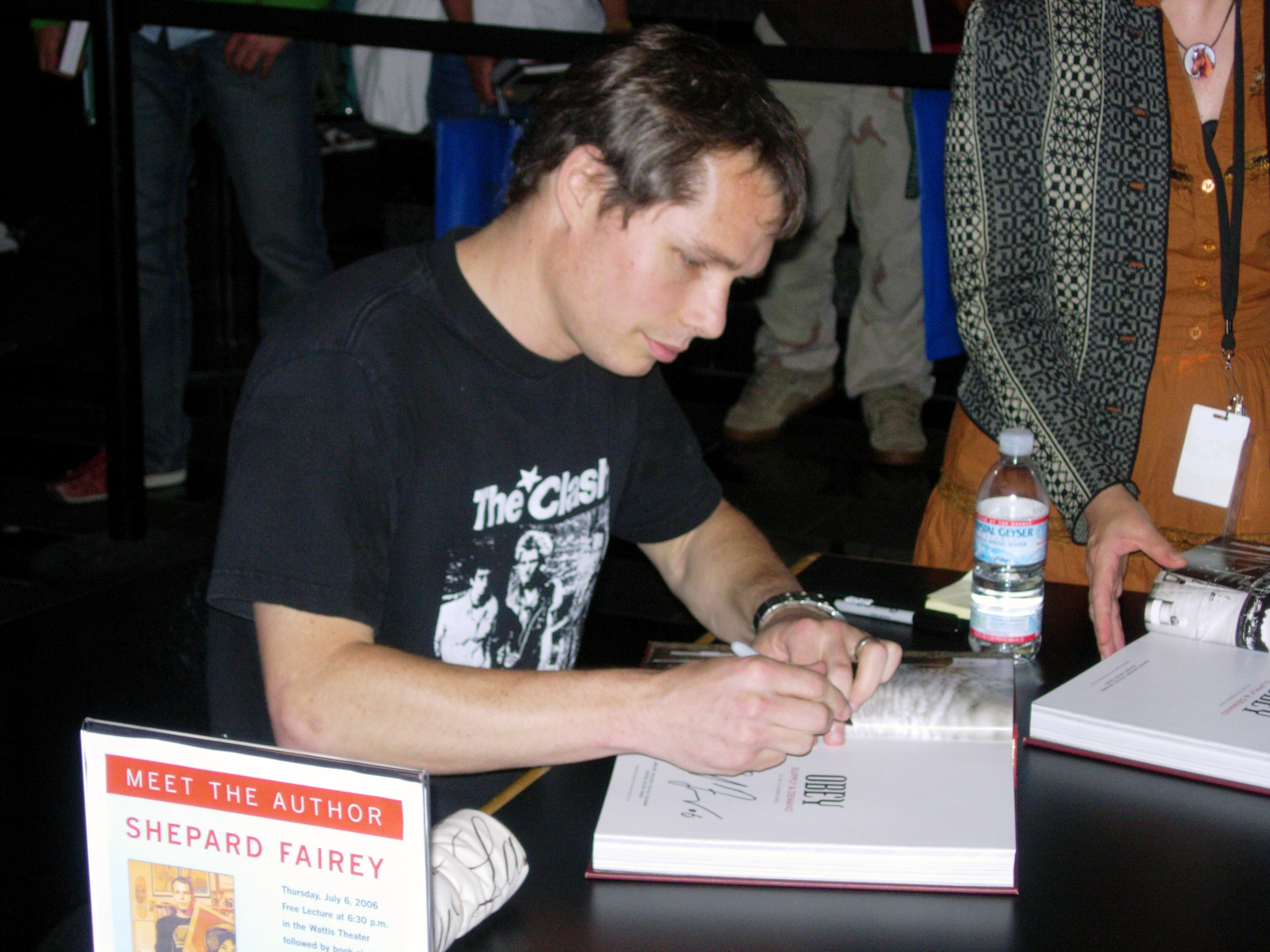
Shepard Fairey

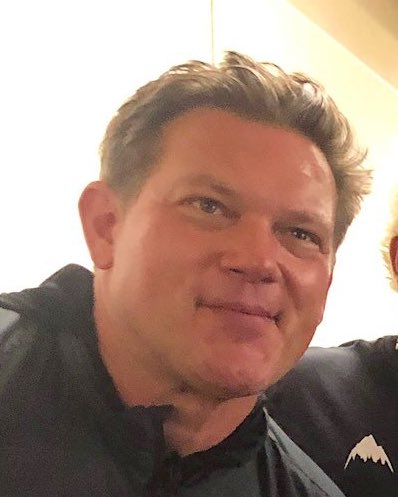
Tyler Florence

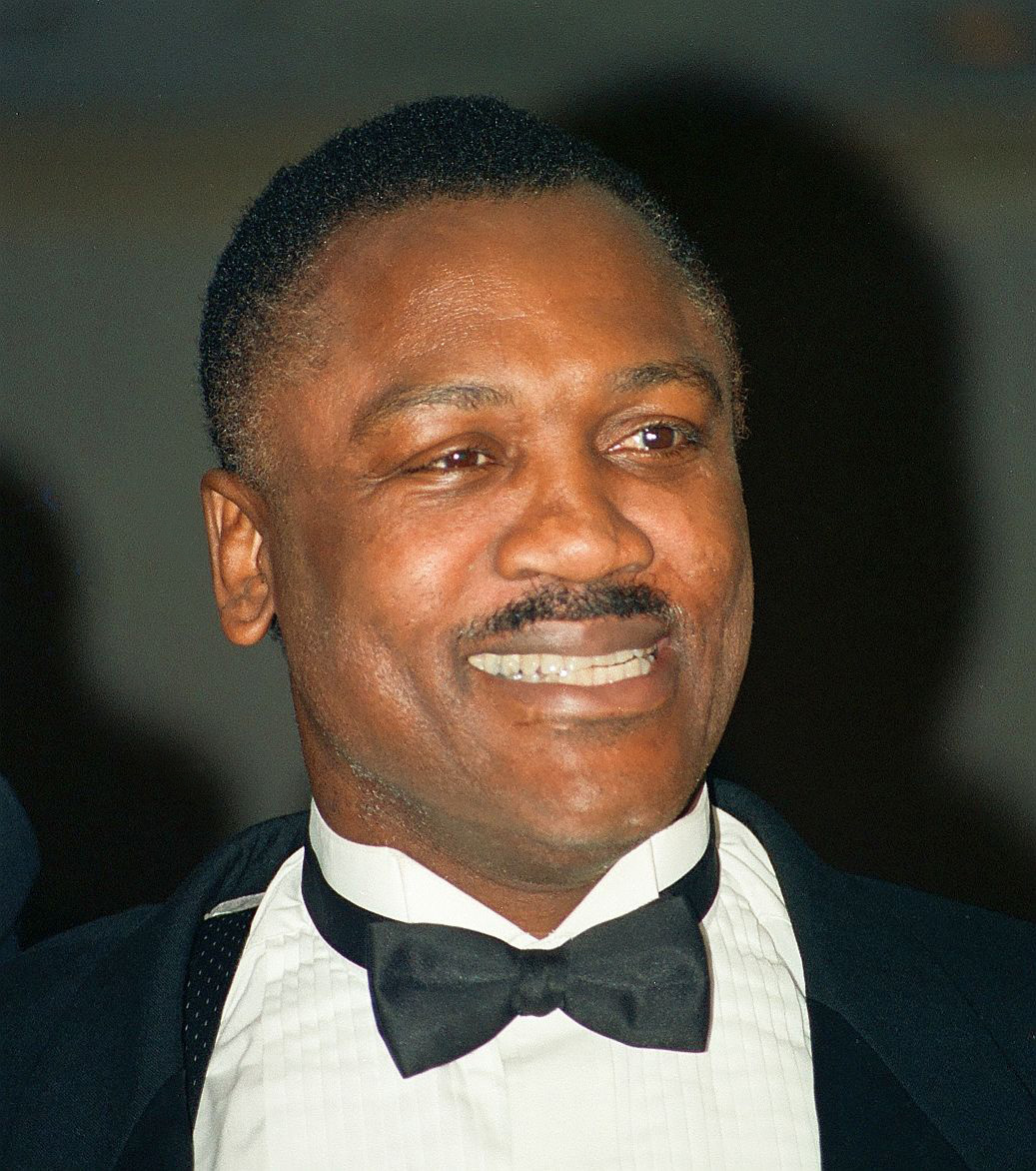
Joe Frazier

- Ainsley Earhardt (born 1976), grew up in Columbia, correspondent for Fox News
- John B. Earle (1766–1836), died in Anderson County, U.S. representative from South Carolina
- Samuel Earle (1760–1833), died in Pendleton District, United States representative from South Carolina
- Marian Wright Edelman (born 1939), born in Bennettsville, activist for the rights of children
- Armanti Edwards (born 1988), born in Greenwood, NFL player for the Carolina Panthers and Cleveland Browns
- Carl Edwards Jr. (born 1991), born in Prosperity, relief pitcher for the Chicago Cubs
- Eddie Edwards (born 1954), born in Sumter, former defensive end for the Cincinnati Bengals football team
- John Edwards (born 1953), born in Seneca, former U.S. senator from North Carolina (1999–2005), 2004 Democratic nominee for vice president under John Kerry
- Leslie Jean Egnot (born 1963), born in Greenville, Olympic yachtswoman for New Zealand
- Frederick J. Eikerenkoetter II, Reverend Ike (1935–2009), born in Ridgeland, minister and electronic evangelist
- Andre Ellington (born 1989), born in Moncks Corner, running back for the Arizona Cardinals
- Bruce Ellington (born 1991), born in Moncks Corner, wide receiver for the San Francisco 49ers
- Shaun Ellis (born 1977), born in Anderson, defensive end for the New York Jets and New England Patriots football team
- Lilian Ellison (1923–2007), born in Kershaw County, female professional wrestler better known as the Fabulous Moolah
- Edward C. Elmore (1826–1873), born in Columbia, treasurer of the Confederate States of America
- Frank Emanuel (born 1942), born in Clio, former football linebacker for Miami Dolphins and the New Orleans Saints
- Alex English (born 1954), born in Columbia, basketball player, member of the Basketball Hall of Fame
- Joe Arnold Erwin (born 1956), born in Florence, entrepreneur and politician, former chairman of the South Carolina Democratic Party
- Esquerita (1935–1986), born in Greenville, singer, songwriter and pianist, original name Eskew Reeder Jr.
- Leomont Evans (born 1974), born in Abbeville, former American football safety in the National Football League for the Washington Redskins
- Ralph B. Everett (born 1951), born in Orangeburg, lobbyist and political staffer
- Richard Evonitz (1963–2002), born in Columbia, serial killer
- Shepard Fairey (born 1970), born in Charleston, artist who created the Barack Obama "Hope" poster
- James Farrow (1827–1892), born in Laurens, politician in Confederate Congress, elected to U.S. House of Representatives
- William G. Farrow (1918–1942), born in Darlington, captured and executed by the Japanese military following the Doolittle Raid
- Shannon Faulkner (born 1975), born in Powdersville, the first female cadet to enter The Citadel
- Aaron Fechter (born 1953), born in Columbia, creator of The Rock-afire Explosion and one of two founders of ShowBiz Pizza Place
- Charles Fernley Fawcett (1915–2008), grew up in Greenville, co-founder of the International Medical Corps
- Raymond Felton (born 1984), born in Marion, professional basketball player
- Eugene Figg (1936–2002), born in Charleston, structural engineer who made numerous contributions to the field of structural engineering
- David E. Finley Jr. (1890–1977), born in York, art executive, first director of the National Gallery of Art, founding chairman of the National Trust for Historic Preservation, and chairman of the United States Commission of Fine Arts
- Kirkman George Finlay (1877–1938), born in Greenville, first bishop of the Episcopal Diocese of Upper South Carolina
- Michael Flessas (born 1959), attended college and lived in South Carolina, actor, best known for his role in the film Dancer in the Dark
- Tyler Florence (born 1971), born in Greenville, television chef
- Rickey Foggie (born 1966), born in Laurens, former quarterback in the Canadian Football League and the Arena Football League
- James Dudley Fooshe (1844–1940), born in Abbeville District (now Greenwood County), soldier, author, farmer, philosopher, and Methodist churchman
- Joe Frazier (1944–2011), born in Beaufort, boxer, 1964 Olympic heavyweight champion and the world heavyweight champ 1970–73
- Nancy Friday (1933–2017), grew up in Charleston, author, specializing in topics of female sexuality and liberation
- Pearl Fryar (born 1940), topiary artist living in Bishopville
- Steven Furtick (born 1980) born in Moncks Corner, founder and lead pastor of Elevation Church

== G–I ==
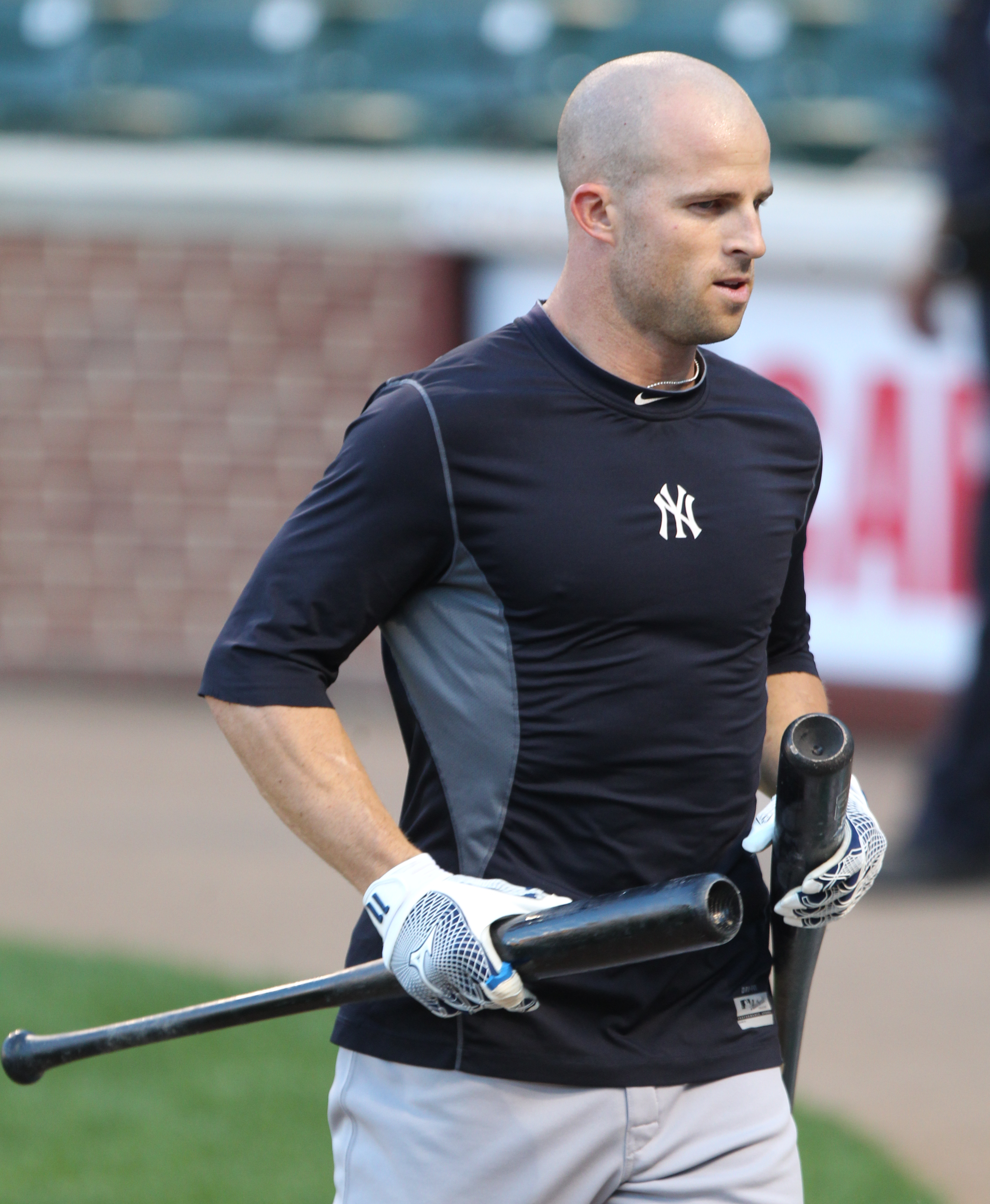
Brett Gardner

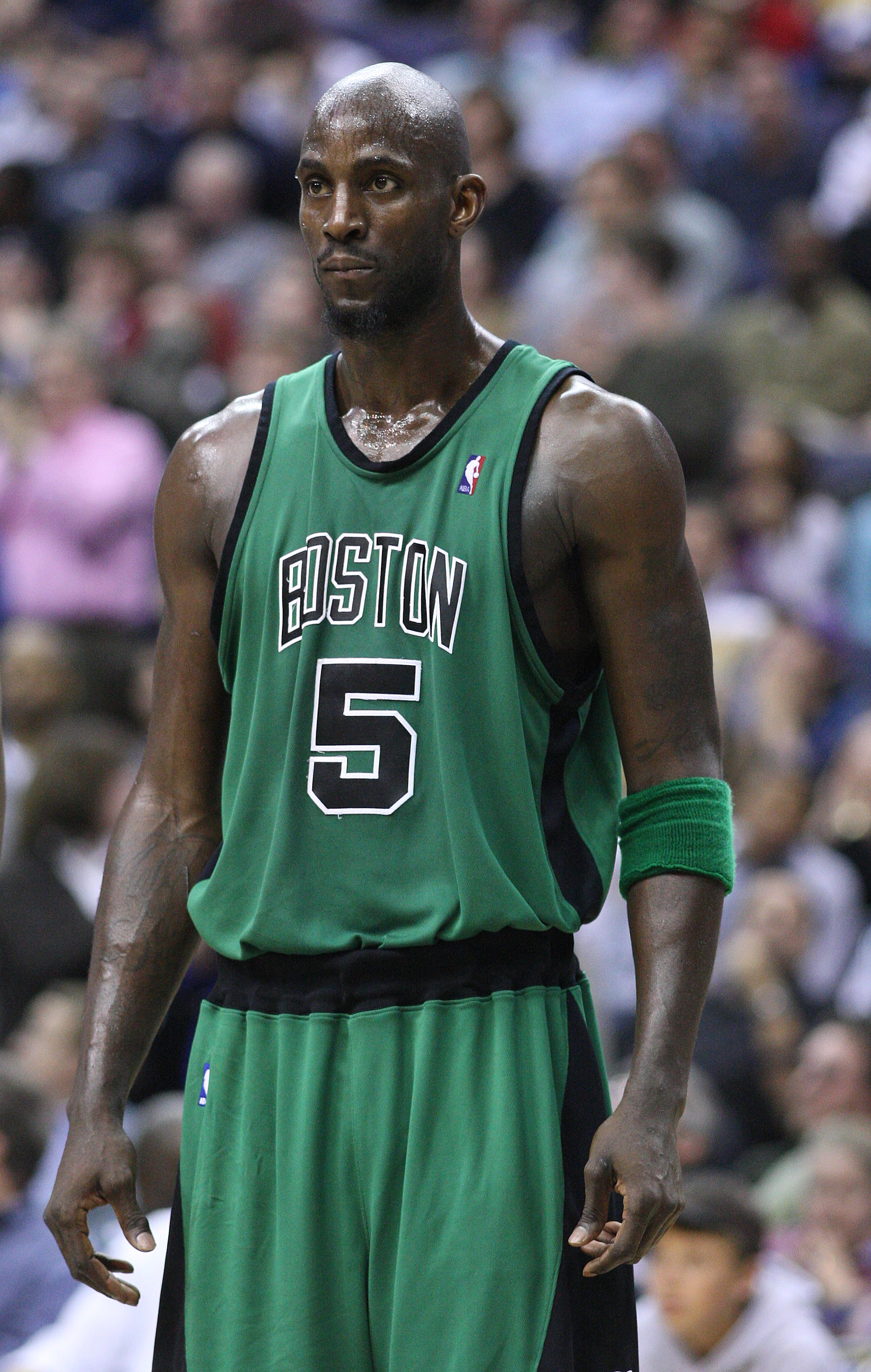
Kevin Garnett

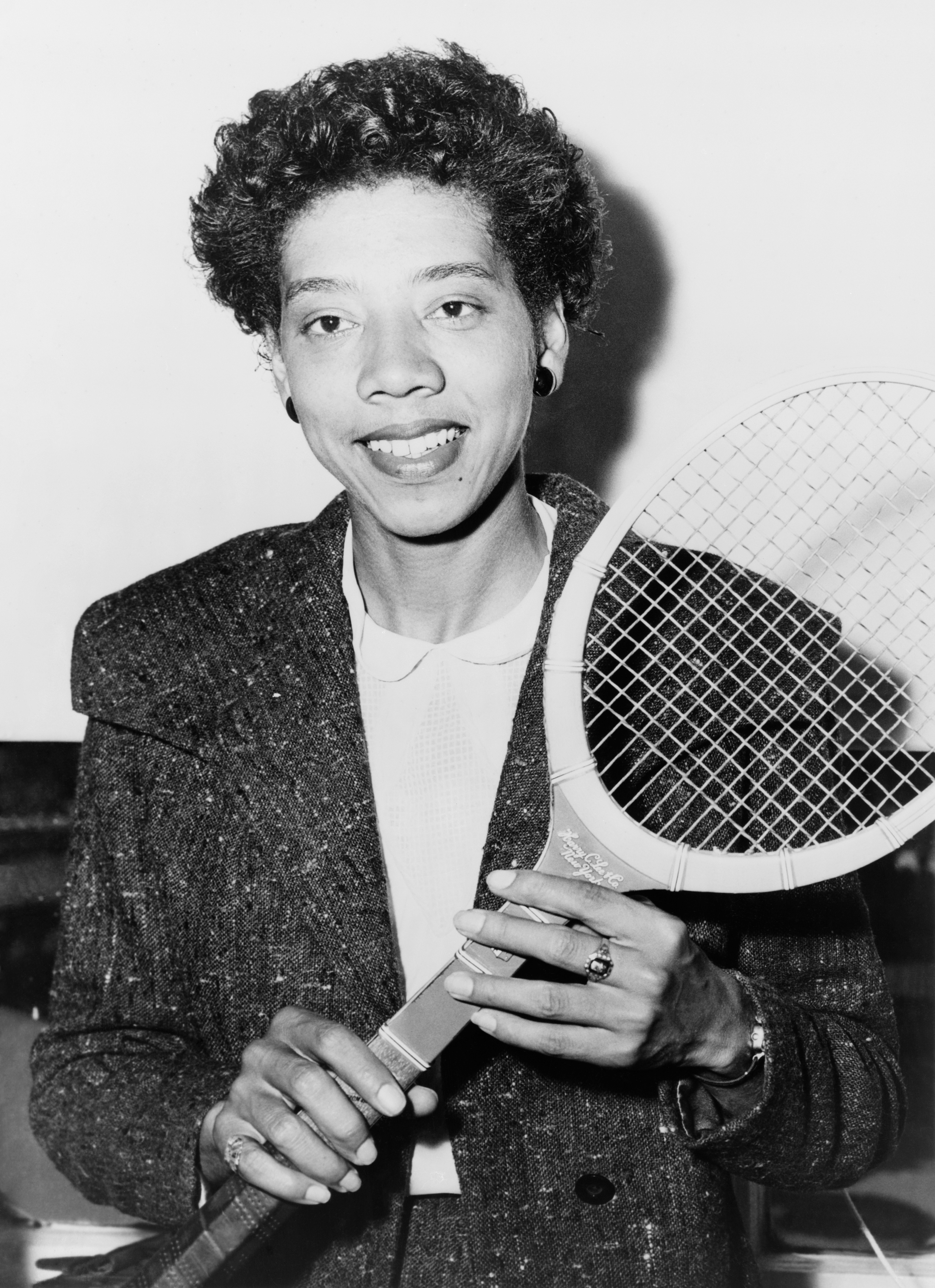
Althea Gibson

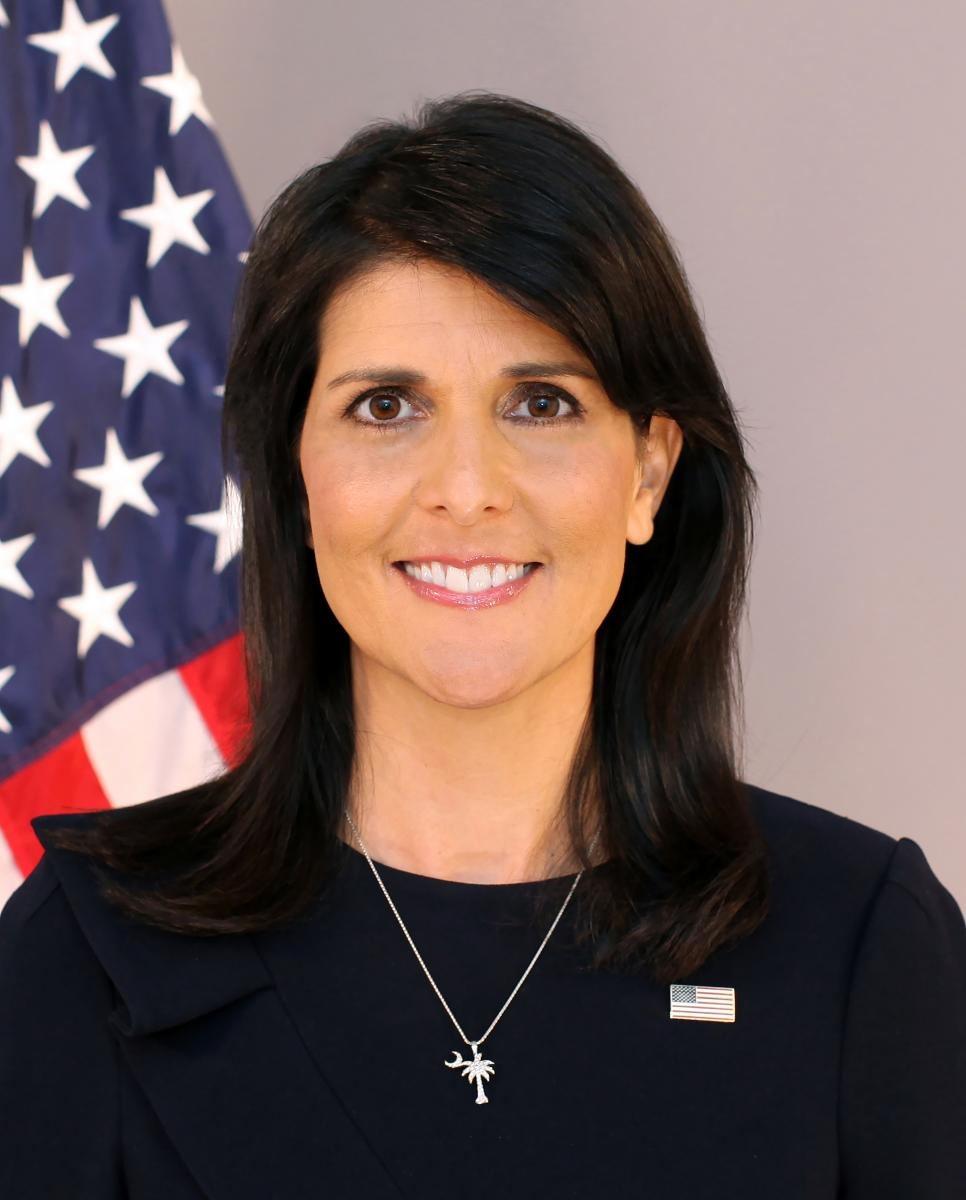
Nikki Haley

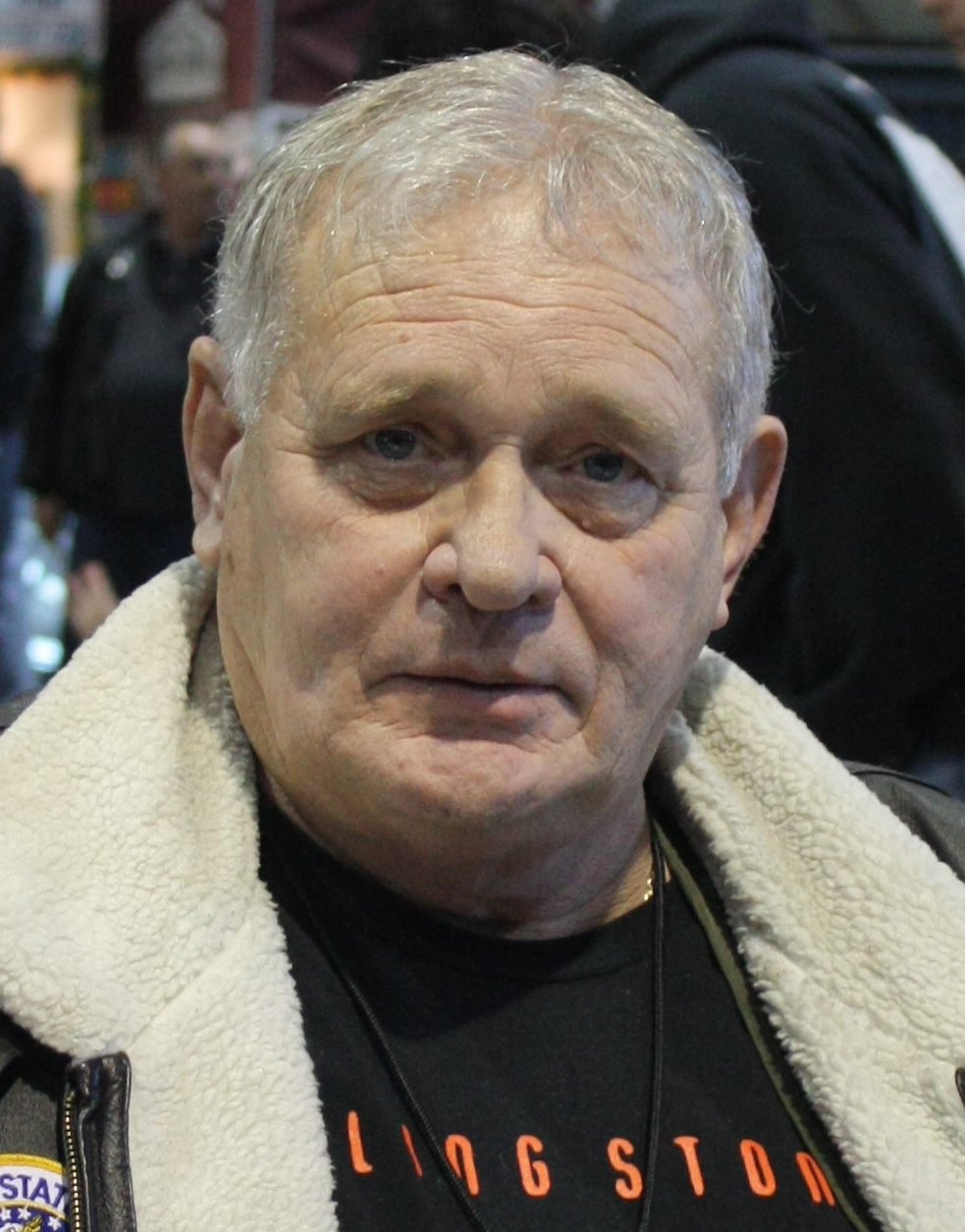
Bo Hopkins

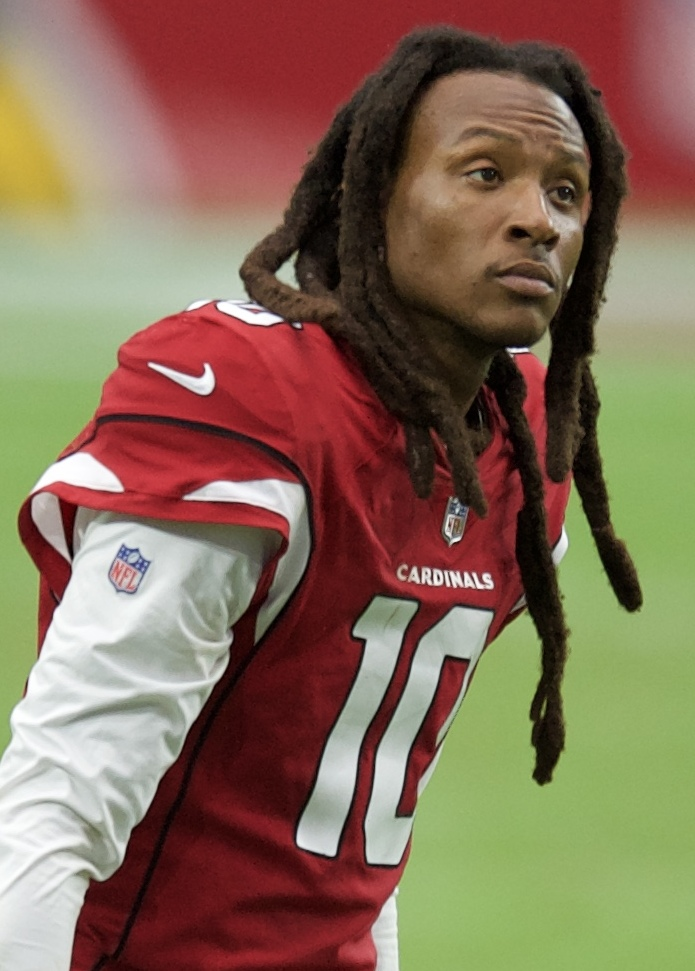
DeAndre Hopkins

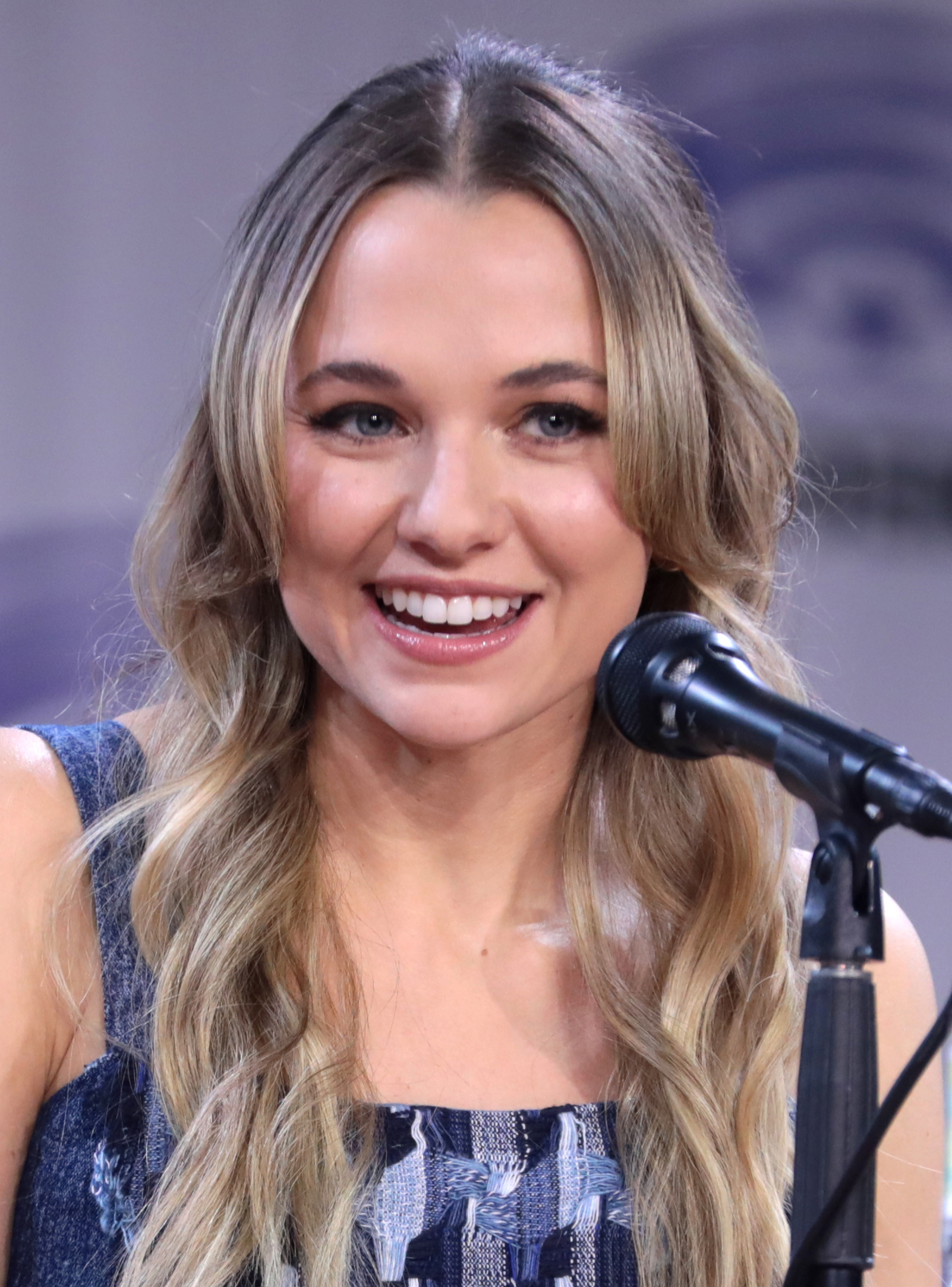
Madison Iseman

- Samkon Gado (born 1982), attended Ben Lippen High School in Columbia, running back in the National Football League
- David du Bose Gaillard (1859–1913), born in Manning, U.S. Army engineer instrumental in the construction of the Panama Canal
- John Gaillard (1765–1826), born in St. Stephen's district, U.S. senator
- Brett Gardner (born 1983), born in Holly Hill, left fielder for the New York Yankees
- Kevin Garnett (born 1976), born in Mauldin, retired professional basketball player for the Minnesota Timberwolves, Boston Celtics, and Brooklyn Nets
- Sarah Ann Haynsworth Gayle (1804–1835), born in Sumter County, diarist
- Leeza Gibbons (born 1957), born in Hartsville, talk show host of Entertainment Tonight and other Hollywood news shows
- Althea Gibson (1927–2003), born in Silver, Clarendon County, first African-American player to win Wimbledon and U.S. National tennis championships
- Thomas Gibson (born 1962), born in Charleston, actor, Criminal Minds
- William Gibson (born 1948), born in Conway, author, credited as the father of the Cyberpunk genre of science fiction
- Dizzy Gillespie (1917–1993), born in Cheraw, African-American jazz trumpeter, bandleader, singer and composer
- Stephon Gilmore (born 1990), born in Rock Hill, NFL cornerback, Super Bowl LIII champion with the New England Patriots
- Gordon Glisson (1930–1997), born in Winnsboro, thoroughbred horse racing jockey
- Candice Glover (born 1989), born in Beaufort, American Idol season 12 winner
- Joseph L. Goldstein (born 1940), born in Kingstree, Nobel Prize-winning biochemist and geneticist
- André Goodman (born 1978), born in Greenville, cornerback for the Denver Broncos
- A. J. Green (born 1988), born in Summerville, wide receiver for the Cincinnati Bengals
- Zack Godley (born 1990), born in Bamberg, starting pitcher for the Arizona Diamondbacks
- Malliciah Goodman (born 1990), born in Florence, defensive end for the Atlanta Falcons
- B. J. Goodson (born 1993), born in Lamar, linebacker for the New York Giants
- Jonathan Goodwin (born 1978), born in Columbia, offensive lineman in the National Football League
- K. Lee Graham (born 1997), from Chapin, won the Miss Teen USA 2014 pageant
- Lindsey Graham (1955–2026), from Central, politician, lawyer, long-time South Carolina Senator since 2003, and unsuccessful 2016 presidential candidate
- Boyce Green (born 1960), born in Beaufort, former running back in the National Football League
- Chad Green (born 1991), born in Greenville, relief pitcher for the New York Yankees
- Alvin Greene (born 1977), born in Florence, 2010 Democratic nominee for United States Senator
- Maxcy Gregg (1814–1862), born in Columbia, lawyer, and brigadier general in the Confederate States Army
- Fred Griffith (born 1964), born in Spartanburg, actor and producer
- James Grimsley Jr. (1921–2013), born in Florence, major general in U.S. Army and president of The Citadel
- Terry Guess (born 1974), from Orangeburg, former NFL wide receiver
- Michael Hackett (born 1960), basketball player, Liga Profesional de Baloncesto MVP in 1984, and Israeli League Top Scorer in 1991
- Johnson Hagood (1828–1898), Confederate general and governor of South Carolina
- Nikki Haley (born 1972), born and raised in Bamberg, Indian-American politician, former governor of South Carolina (2010–2017), and United States ambassador to the United Nations since 2017
- Trevor Hall (born 1986), from Hilton Head Island, musician
- Jakar Hamilton (born 1989), from Johnston, safety for the Dallas Cowboys
- Michael Hamlin (born 1985), from Lamar, safety for the Jacksonville Jaguars
- Jason Hammel (born 1982), from Greenville, starting pitcher for the Kansas City Royals
- James Henry Hammond (1807–1864), US congressman, senator and governor of South Carolina
- Shanola Hampton (born 1977), from Charleston, actress, on Showtime series Shameless
- Wade Hampton I (1752–1835), U.S. Congressman from South Carolina, born in Virginia
- Wade Hampton II (1791–1858), born in Columbia, plantation owner and soldier
- Wade Hampton III (1818–1902), born in Charleston, Confederate general, governor, United States Senator
- Ken "The Hawk" Harrelson (born 1941), born in Woodruff, television broadcast announcer for the Chicago White Sox
- Ryan Hartman (born 1994), born in Hilton Head Island, first player in NHL history to be born in South Carolina
- Albert Haynesworth (born 1981), from Hartsville, defensive tackle for the Tennessee Titans
- Matt Hazel (born 1992), from North Augusta, wide receiver for the Miami Dolphins
- Heath Hembree (born 1989), from Cowpens, relief pitcher for the Boston Red Sox
- DuBose Heyward (1885–1940), born in Charleston, playwright and poet, wrote the novel Porgy and its stage incarnations Porgy and Porgy and Bess
- Thomas Heyward Jr. (1746–1809), signer of the Declaration of Independence
- Jordan Hill (born 1987), from Newberry, National Basketball Association player
- Lauren Michelle Hill (born 1979), from Columbia, model, actress, Playboy Playmate
- Thomas Hitchcock Jr. (1900–1944), polo player
- Vonnie Holliday (born 1975), from Camden, former NFL defensive lineman
- Chris Hope (born 1980), from Rock Hill, former NFL safety
- Bo Hopkins (1942–2022), from Greenville, actor
- DeAndre Hopkins (born 1992), from Central, NFL wide receiver
- Corinne Stocker Horton (1871–1947), born in Orangeburg, elocutionist, journalist, and newspaper editor
- Todd Howard (born 1965), from Spartanburg, entrepreneur and public figure
- Orlando Hudson (born 1977), from Darlington, Gold Glove-winning Major League Baseball player
- Josephine Humphreys (born 1945), from Charleston, author
- Fiona Hutchison (born 1960), raised in Columbia and attended Clemson University, soap opera actress
- J. B. Hutto (1926–1983), born in Blackville, blues musician
- Lauren Hutton (born 1943), from Charleston, supermodel, actress
- Dontrelle Inman (born 1989), from Charleston, NFL and Canadian Football League wide receiver
- Madison Iseman (born 1997), from Myrtle Beach, actress
- George Izard (1776–1828), general in War of 1812, and 2nd governor of Arkansas Territory

== J–L ==
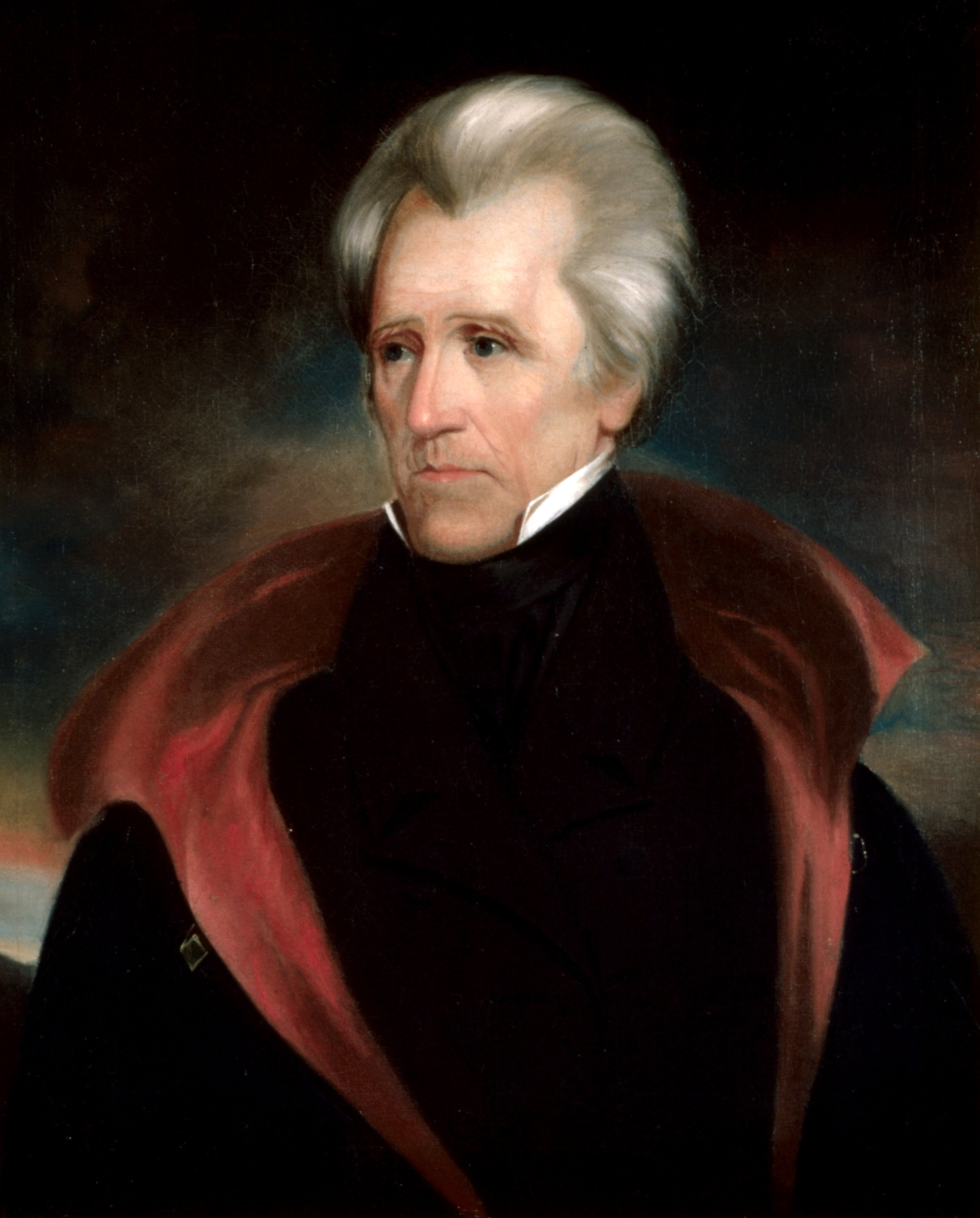
Andrew Jackson

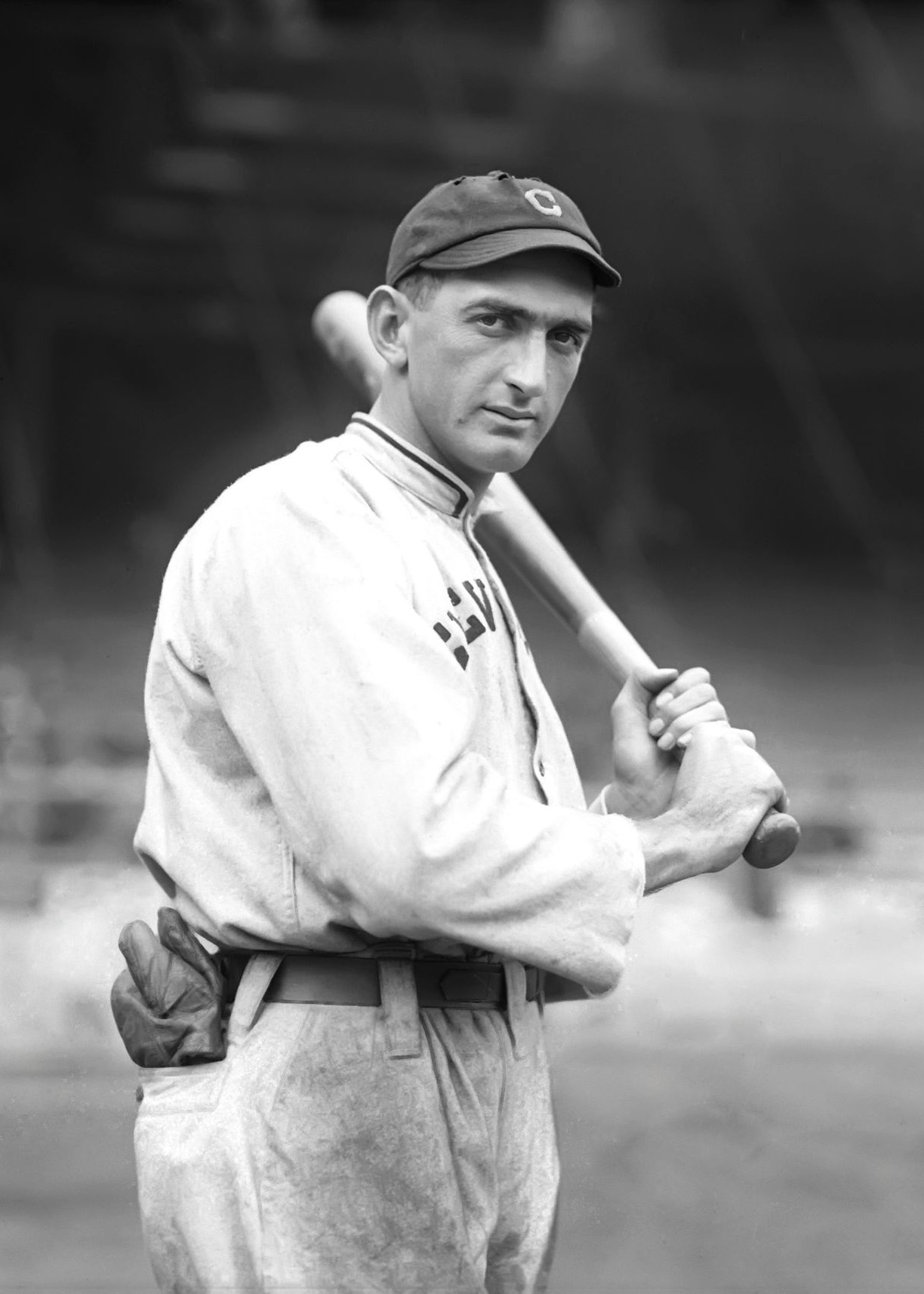
Shoeless Joe Jackson

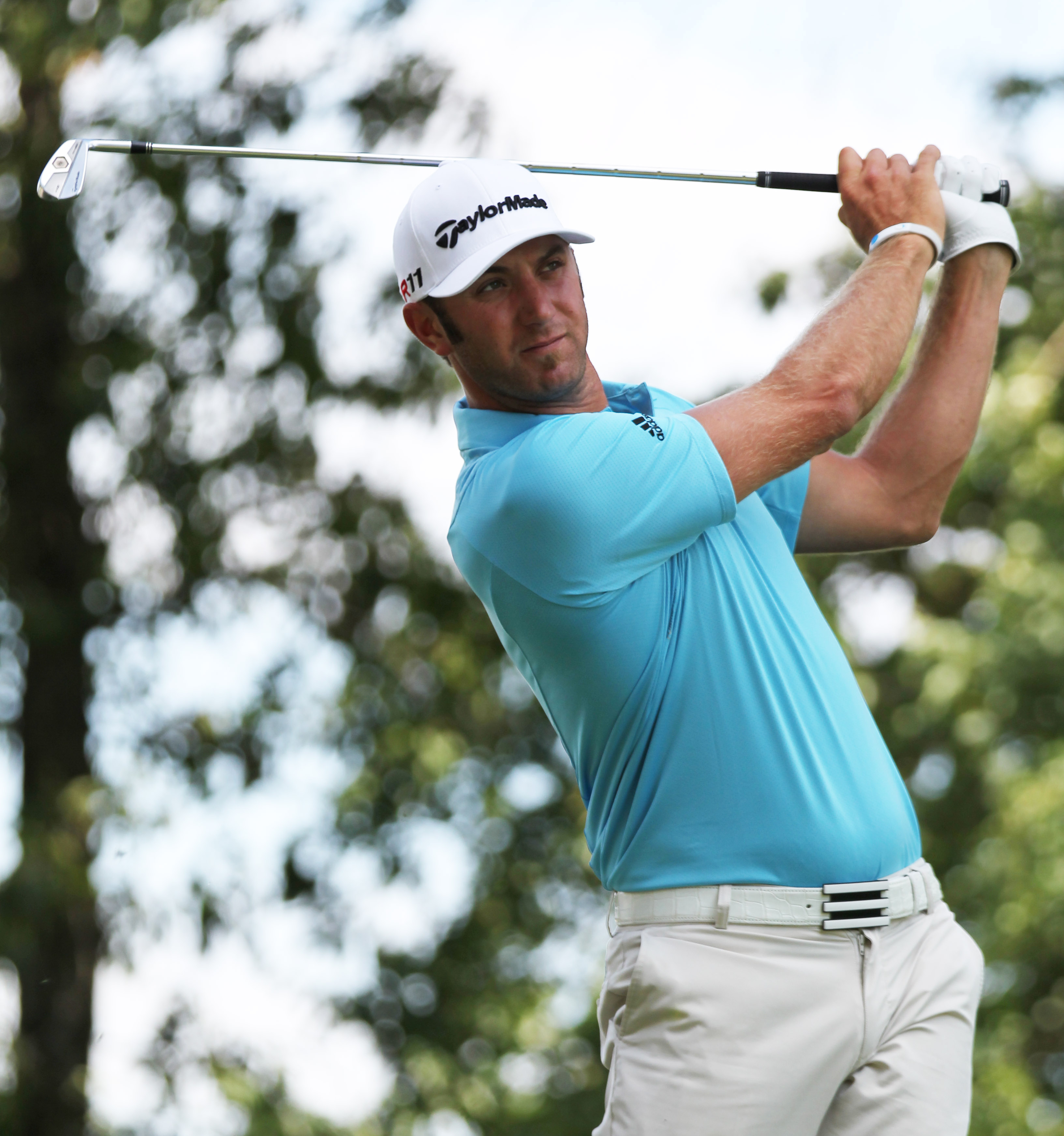
Dustin Johnson

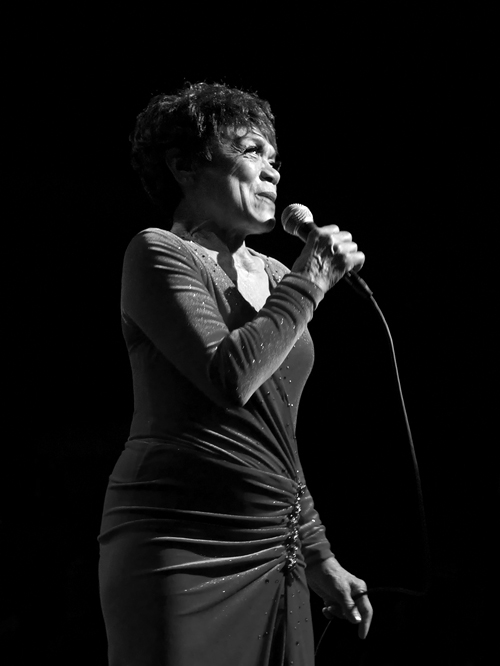
Eartha Kitt

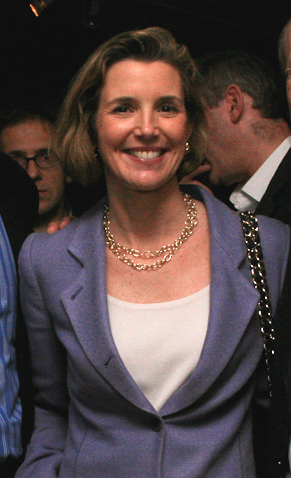
Sallie Krawcheck

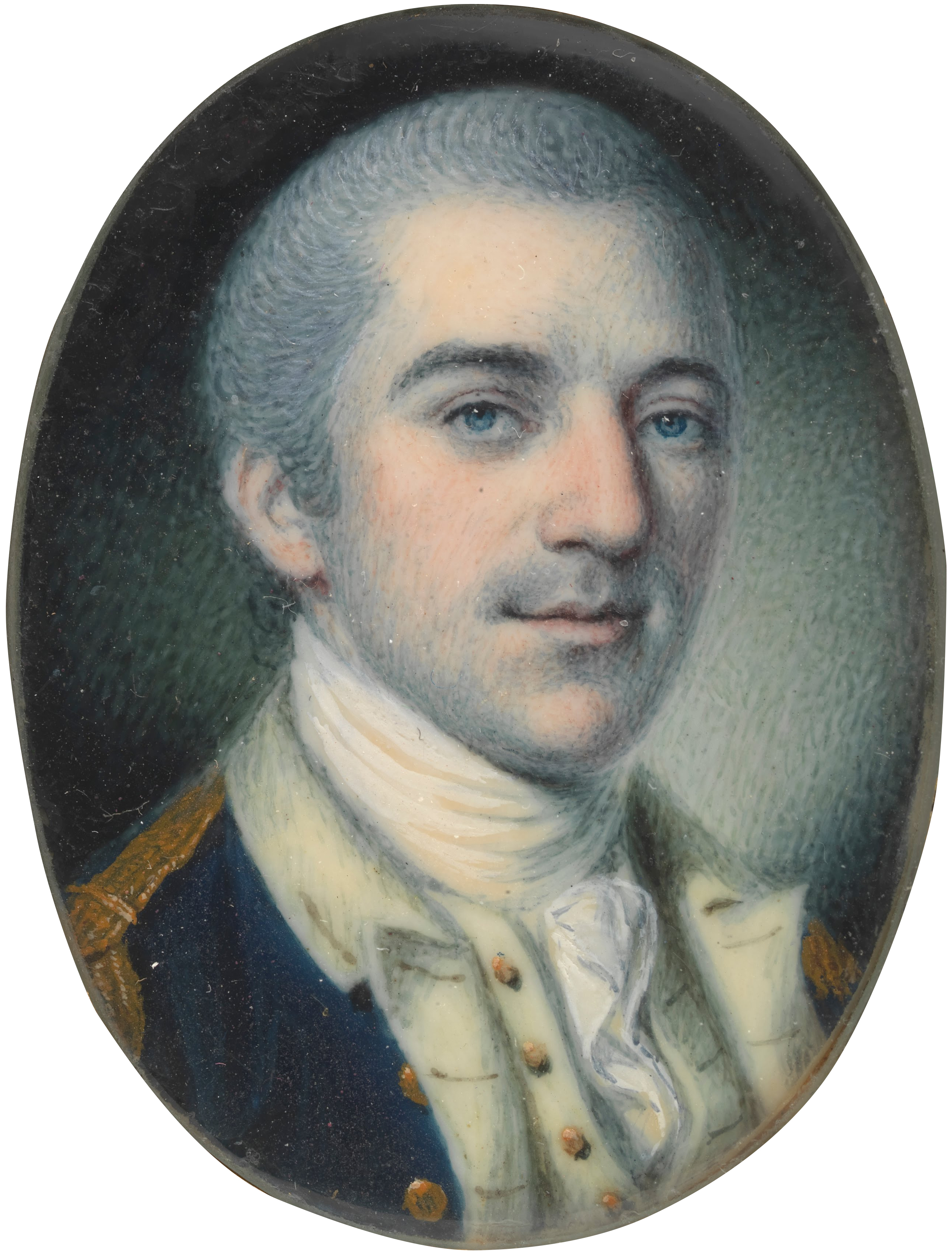
John Laurens

- Andrew Jackson (1765–1845), 7th president of the United States
- Jesse Jackson (1941–2026), born in Greenville, politician and civil rights activist
- 'Shoeless' Joe Jackson (1887–1951), former outfielder for Chicago White Sox
- John G. Jackson (1907–1993), from Aiken, Pan-Africanist historian, lecturer, teacher and writer
- James Jamerson (1938–1983), from Edisto Island, bass player
- Anthony James (1942–2020), from Myrtle Beach, actor, Unforgiven
- Josiah-Jordan James (born 2000), from Charleston, basketball forward in the Israeli Basketball Premier League
- Young Jeezy (born 1977 as Jay Wayne Jenkins), born in Columbia, rap and hip-hop performer
- Sylvia Jefferies (born 1969), born in Greenwood, actress, Nashville
- Melissa Jefferson-Wooden (born 2001), born in Georgetown, Olympic gold and bronze medalist in track
- Alshon Jeffery (born 1990), born in St. Matthews, wide receiver for the Philadelphia Eagles
- Willie Jeffries (born 1937), born in Union, former player and head football coach of South Carolina State University, first African American head coach of an NCAA Division I-A football program at a predominantly White college, member of the College Football Hall of Fame
- Jarvis Jenkins (born 1988), born in Clemson, defensive end for the Washington Redskins
- Tim Jennings (born 1983), born in Orangeburg, cornerback for the Chicago Bears
- Caroline Howard Jervey (1823–1877), born in Charleston, author and poet
- Jasper Johns (born 1933), grew up in Allendale, painter and printmaker
- Anthony Johnson (born 1974), born in Charleston, professional basketball player
- Mitchell Johnson (born 1964), painter
- Dustin Johnson (born 1984), born in Columbia, professional golfer
- T. J. Johnson (born 1990), born in Aynor, former NFL center for the Cincinnati Bengals
- William H. Johnson (1901–1970), from Florence, artist
- Xavier Johnson (born 1995), born in Orangeburg, Greco-Roman wrestler
- Christopher Jones (born 1982), born in Myrtle Beach, actor and dancer
- Greg Jones (born 1981), born in Beaufort, fullback for the Jacksonville Jaguars
- Orlando Jones (born 1968), attended high school in Mauldin, comedian and actor
- Alexis Jordan (born 1992), born in Columbia, R&B and pop singer
- Robert Jordan (1948–2007), fantasy author
- James "Radio" Kennedy (1947–2019), born in Anderson, SC, personality
- Joseph B. Kershaw (1822–1894), slave owner and Confederate general who served as a Division Commander, Army of Northern Virginia, State Senator, Circuit Court Judge
- Michael Kesselring (born 2000), born in Florence, NHL player
- Spencer Kieboom (born 1991), born in Mount Pleasant, catcher for the Washington Nationals
- Terry Kinard (born 1959), from Sumter, former safety for the New York Giants and Houston Oilers
- Betsy King (born 1955), from Spartanburg, golfer, member of World Golf Hall of Fame
- Lane Kirkland (1922–1999), labor union leader and president of the AFL–CIO, 1979–1995
- Richard Rowland Kirkland (1843–1863), Confederate soldier
- Eartha Kitt (1927–2008), actress, singer, and cabaret star
- Michael Kohn (born 1986), from Camden, former relief pitcher for the Los Angeles Angels
- Mike Kohn (born 1972), from Columbia, American bobsledder, two-time Olympian and bronze medalist at the 2002 Winter Olympics
- Noah O. Knight (1929–1951), soldier in the United States Army during the Korean War, posthumously received the Medal of Honor
- Sterling Knight (born 1989), from Hilton Head Island, actor, singer-songwriter, musician
- Matt William Knowles (born 1985), from Greenville, actor
- Sallie Krawcheck (born 1964), from Charleston, former chairman and chief executive officer of Citi Global Wealth Management
- John Laurens (1754–1782), soldier and statesman from South Carolina during the American Revolutionary War
- Lance Laury (born 1982), from Hopkins, football player, linebacker for the New York Jets
- DeMarcus Lawrence (born 1992), from Aiken, defensive end for the Dallas Cowboys
- Andy Lee (born 1982), from Westminster, football player, punter for the San Francisco 49ers
- Mary Elizabeth Lee (1813–1849), born in Charleston, writer
- Hyman Isaac Long (born 18th century), born in Jamaica, Freemason
- Terry Long (1959–2005), guard for the Pittsburgh Steelers
- James "Pete" Longstreet (1821–1904), Confederate general, commander of the 1st Corps of the Army of Northern Virginia
- Trey Lorenz (born 1969), from Florence, R&B singer
- Harry B. Luthi (1933–2019), from Greenville, former mayor and retired businessman
- Jordan Lyles (born 1990), from Hartsville, MLB player, starting pitcher for the Colorado Rockies
- Thomas Lynch Jr. (1749–1779), signer of the Declaration of Independence

== M–O ==
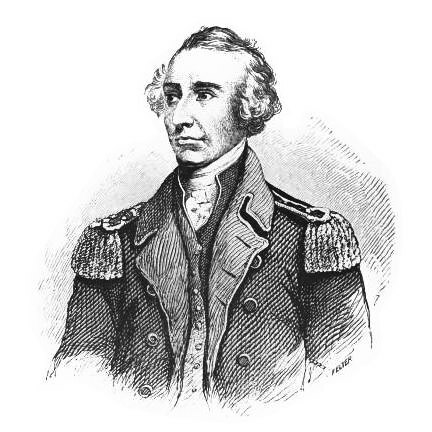
Francis Marion

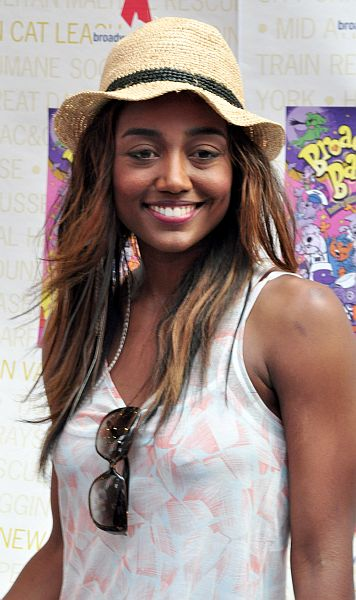
Patina Miller

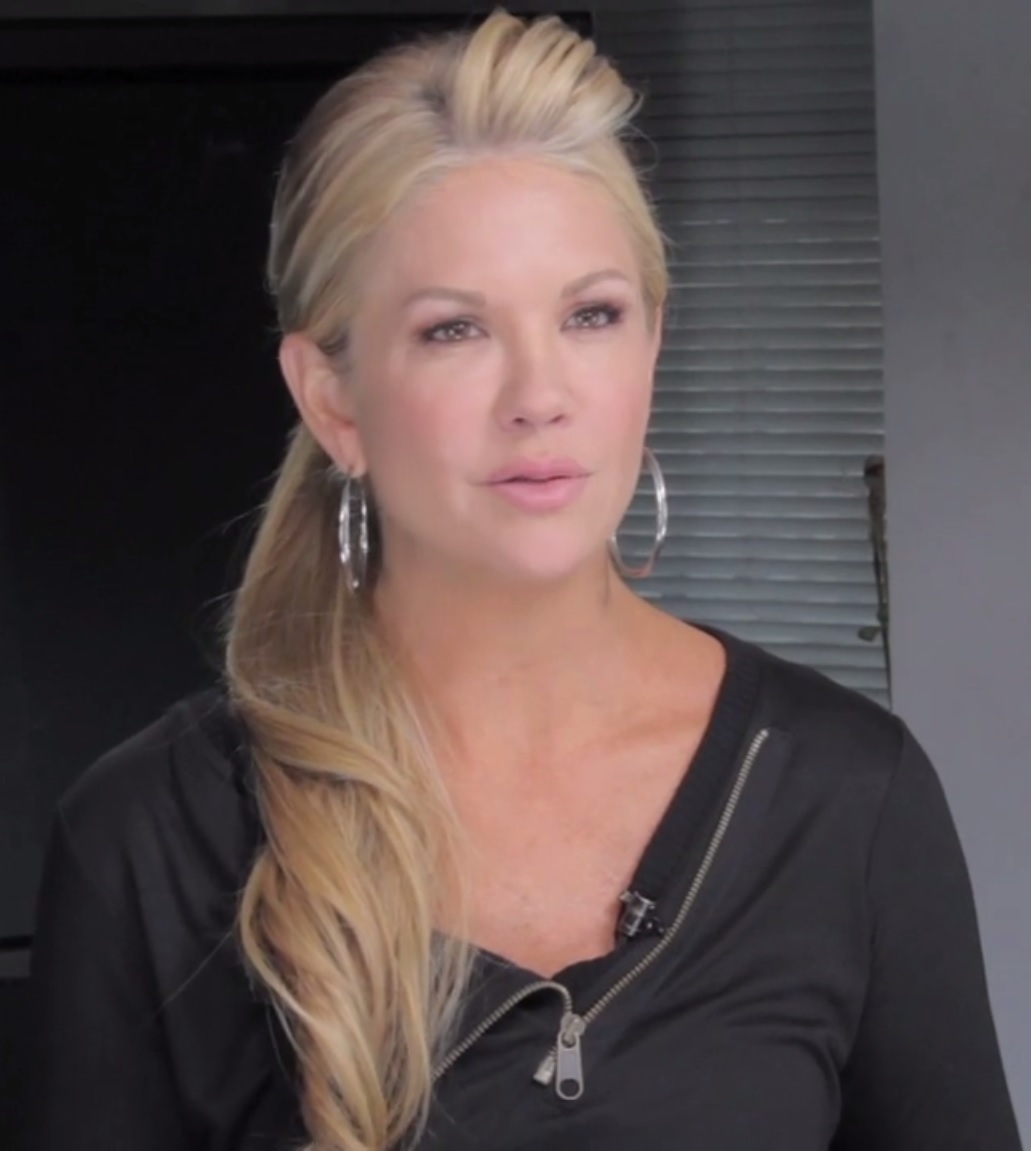
Nancy O'Dell

- Andie MacDowell (born 1958), born in Gaffney, model and actress
- Barton MacLane (1902–1969), born in Columbia, actor, playwright, and screenwriter
- James Robert Mann (1920–2010), born in Greenville, soldier, lawyer and United States representative
- Francis Marion (c. 1732–1795), born in Winyah (Winyah Bay), a.k.a. the Swamp Fox, strategic fighter against the British during the War of Independence
- Logan Marshall-Green (born 1976), born in Charleston, actor, Dark Blue
- George Martin (born 1953), from Greenville, former defensive end for the New York Giants
- Cliff Matthews (born 1989), born in Cheraw, defensive end for the Atlanta Falcons
- Byron Maxwell (born 1988), born in North Charleston, cornerback for the Philadelphia Eagles
- Anthuan Maybank (born 1969), born in Georgetown, gold medalist in 4x400 at 1996 Summer Olympics
- Edwin McCain (born 1970), born in Greenville, musician and songwriter
- Johnathan McClain (born 1970), born in Myrtle Beach, actor and writer
- Annie Virginia McCracken (1868–?), born in Charleston; published a magazine while living in Summerville
- Tony McDaniel (born 1985), born in Hartsville, defensive tackle for the Seattle Seahawks
- Rocky McIntosh (born 1982), grew up in Gaffney, linebacker for the Washington Redskins
- Marian McKnight (born 1936), born in Manning, Miss America 1957, actress, producer and writer
- Tre McLean (born 1993), basketball player in the Israeli Basketball Premier League
- Henry McMaster (born 1947), born in Columbia, governor of South Carolina since 2017
- Ronald McNair (1950–1986), born in Lake City, astronaut killed in the explosion of the Space Shuttle Challenger
- Walter Russell Mead (born 1952), born in Columbia, journalist, editor-at-large of The American Interest magazine
- Dave Meggett (born 1966), born in Charleston, former NFL running back, primarily with the New York Giants
- Craig Melvin (born 1979), from Columbia, NBC News anchor
- Jamon Meredith (born 1986), born in Simpsonville, professional football player, offensive tackle for the New York Giants
- Arthur Middleton (1742–1787), born in Charleston, signer of the Declaration of Independence, governor (1810–1812), representative (1815–1819), and minister to Russia (1820–1830)
- William Ephraim Mikell (1868–1944), born in Sumter, Dean of the University of Pennsylvania Law School
- Patina Miller (born 1984), born in Pageland, actress, singer, Madam Secretary, All My Children, The Hunger Games: Mockingjay films
- Robert Mills (1781–1855), born in Charleston, architect, designed the Washington Monument and many public buildings
- Adam Minarovich (born 1977), from Anderson, actor
- Vanessa Minnillo (born 1980), from Charleston, television personality on Entertainment Tonight
- Jordan Montgomery (born 1992), from Sumter, starting pitcher for the New York Yankees
- Tim Montgomery (born 1975), from Gaffney, Olympic athlete, and ESPY AWARD winner
- Darla Moore (born 1954), born in Lake City, financial executive
- D. J. Moore (born 1987), born in Spartanburg, professional football player, cornerback for the Chicago Bears
- Ja Morant (born 1999), born in Dalzell, No.2 pick in NBA Draft, NBA player for the Memphis Grizzlies
- Julianne Morris (born 1968), born in Columbia, actress, Days of Our Lives
- Maurice Morris (born 1979), born in Chester, professional football player, running back for the Detroit Lions
- R. Winston Morris (born 1941), from Barnwell, tuba player and composer, professor at Tennessee Technological University
- Kary Mullis (1944–2019), grew up in Columbia, biochemist and Nobel laureate
- Mick Mulvaney (born 1967), grew up in Indian Land, former director of the Office of Management and Budget
- Allison Munn (born 1974), grew up in Columbia, actress
- Jim Neal (1930–2011), born in Silverstreet, former NBA player
- Kris Neely (born 1978), born in Spartanburg, artist who has created more than 10,000 Guardian angel paintings
- Clifton Newman, judge who presided over several high profile criminal cases
- Josh Norman (born 1987), from Greenwood, cornerback for the Washington Redskins
- Billy O'Dell (1933–2018), born in Whitmire, MLB pitcher
- Nancy O'Dell (born 1966), born in Sumter, TV personality, Access Hollywood and Entertainment Tonight
- Jermaine O'Neal (born 1978), born in Columbia, basketball player for the Boston Celtics
- Chris Owings (born 1991), born in Charleston, MLB player

== P–S ==
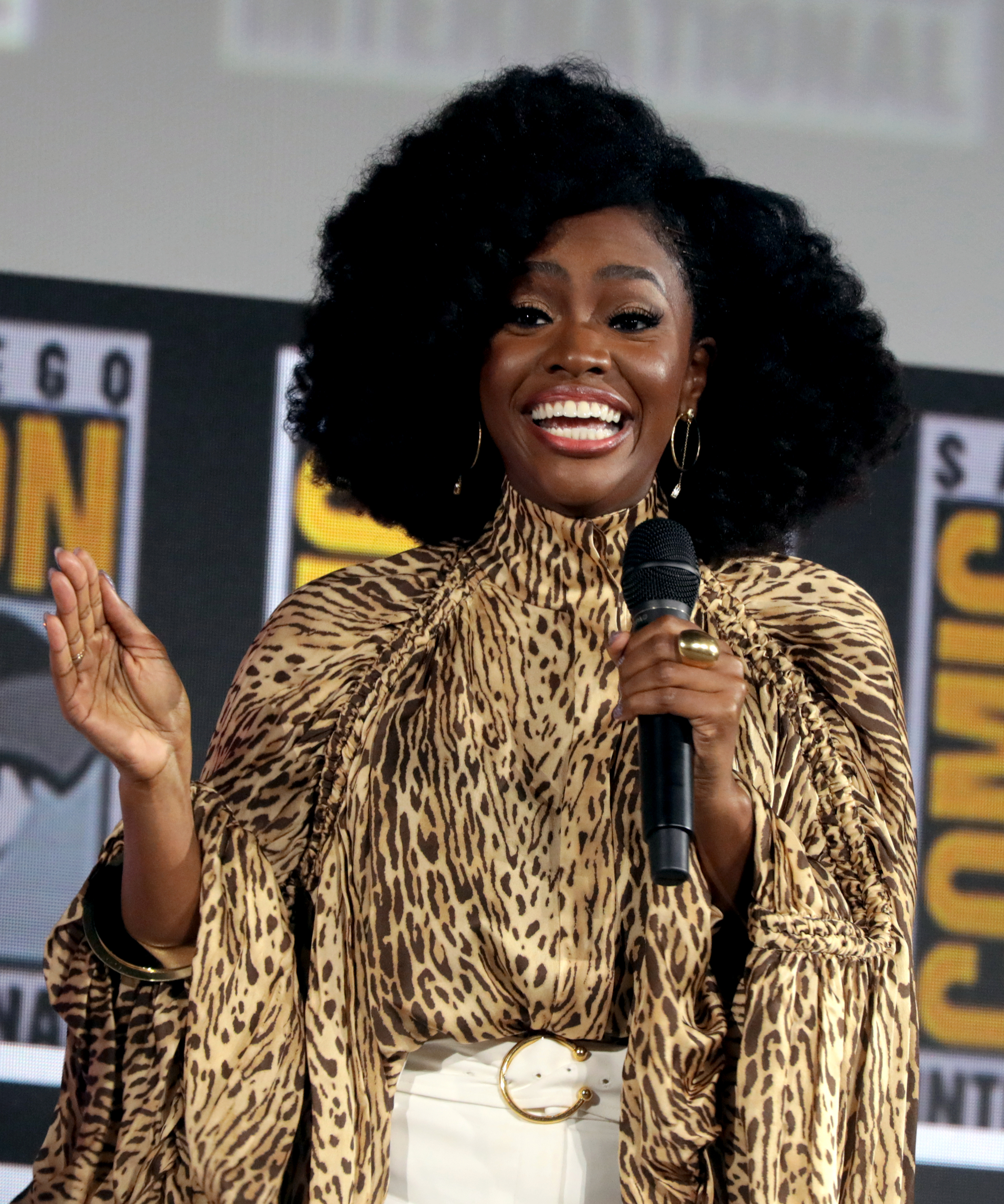
Teyonah Parris

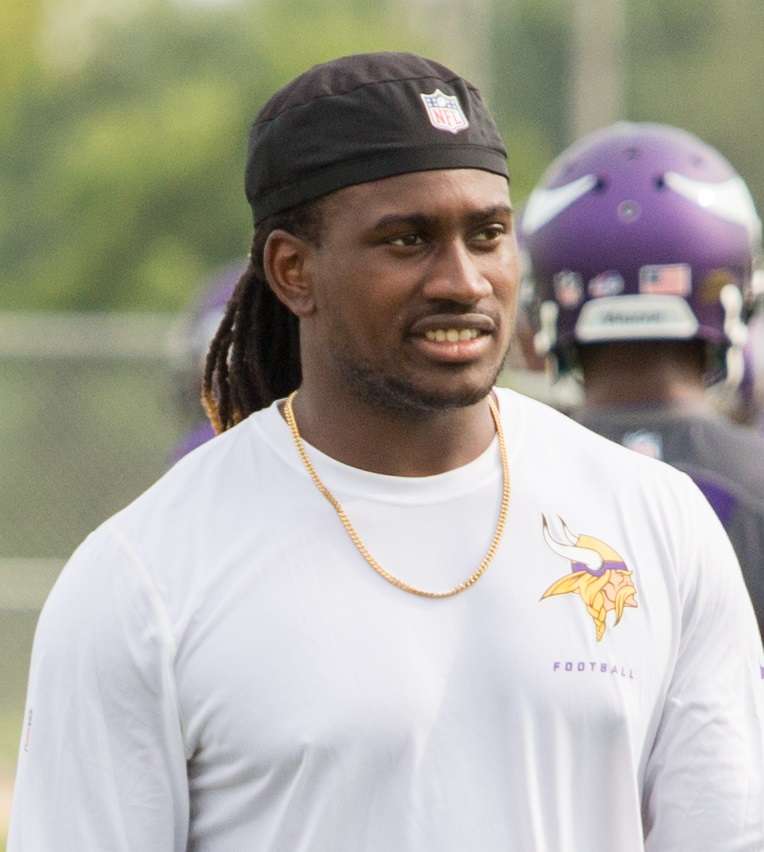
Cordarrelle Patterson

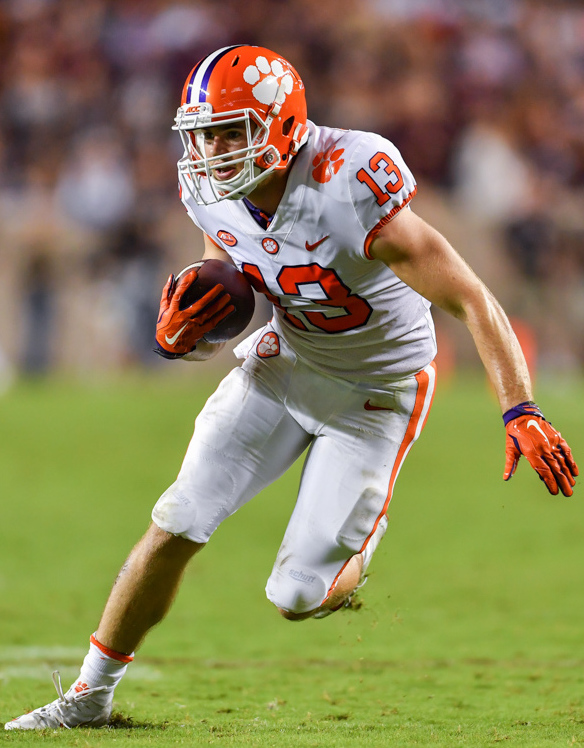
Hunter Renfrow

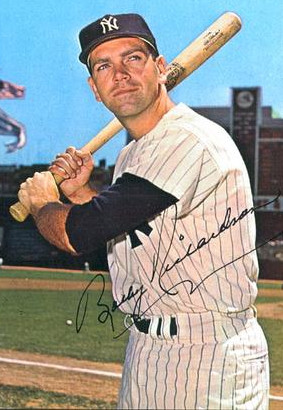
Bobby Richardson

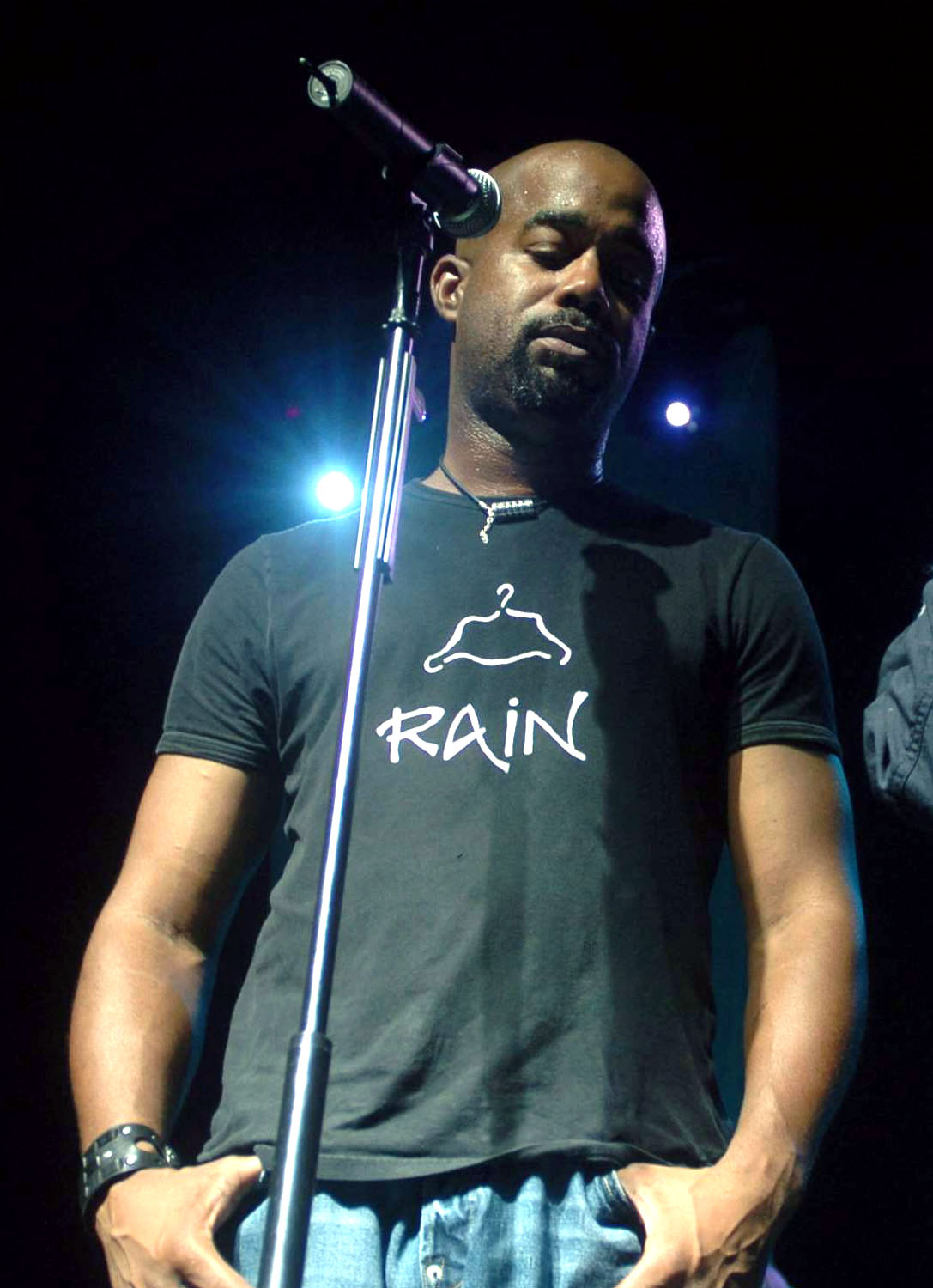
Darius Rucker

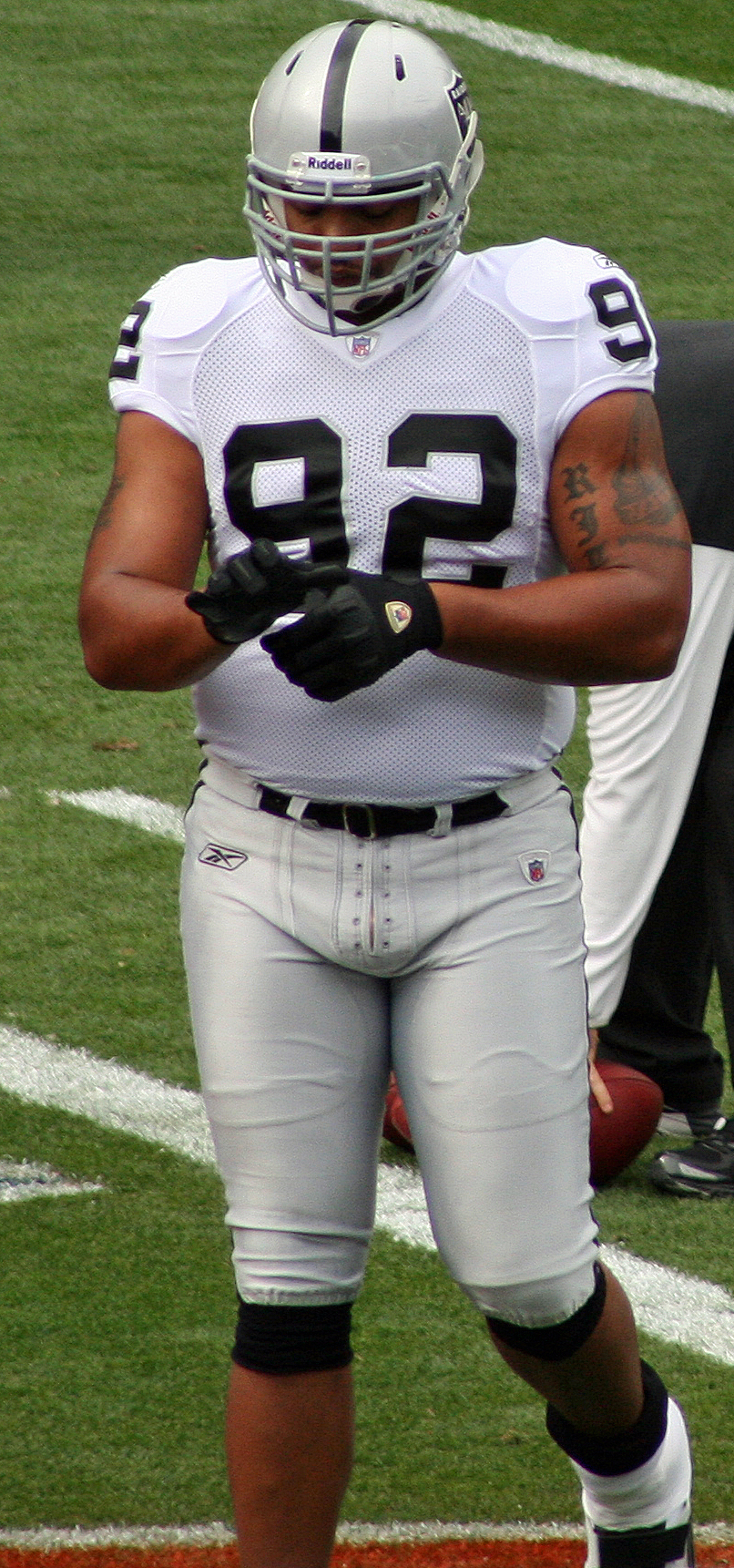
Richard Seymour

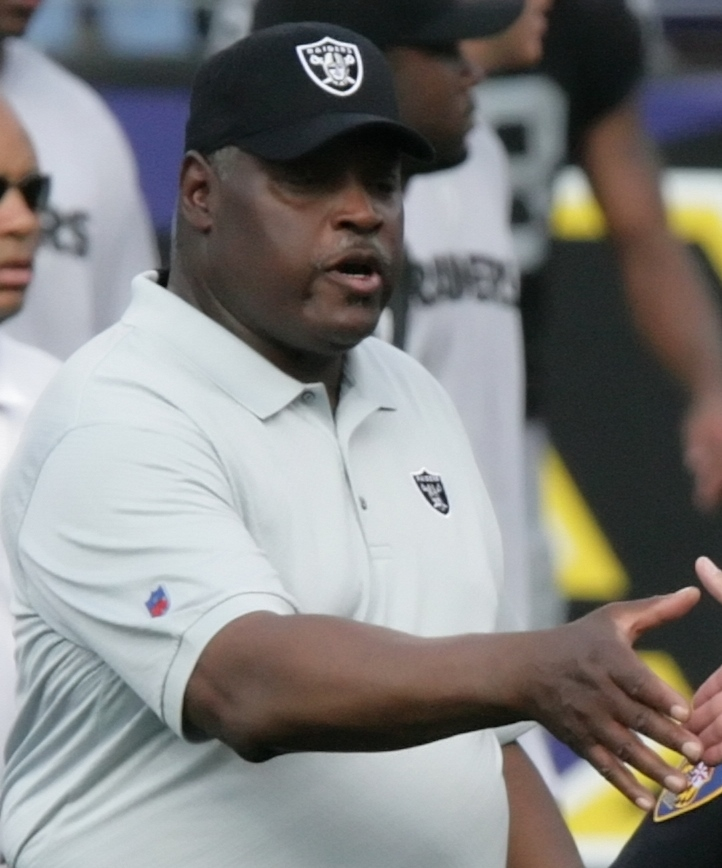
Art Shell

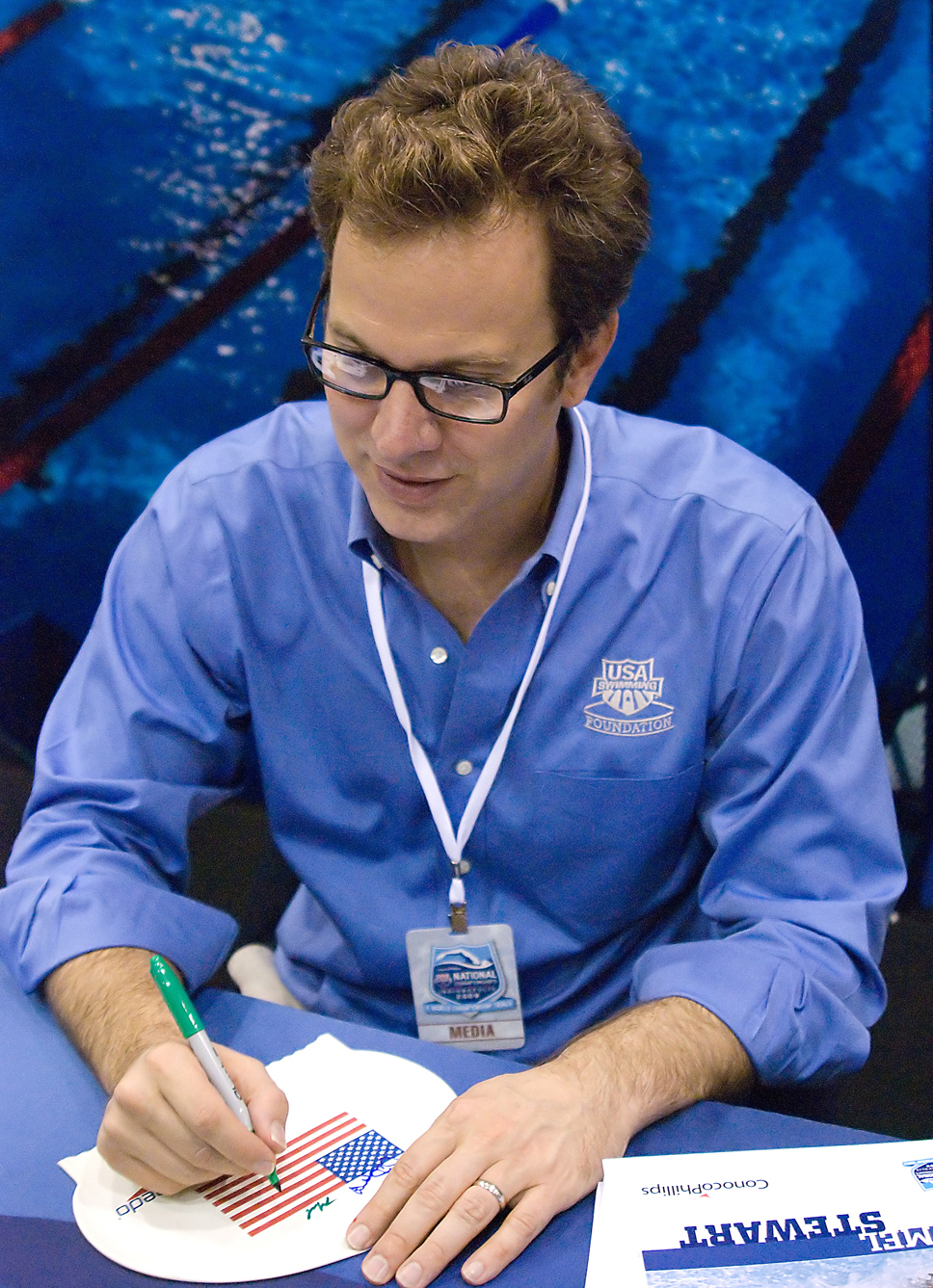
Melvin Stewart

- Emilio Pagán, closer for the Tampa Bay Rays, from Simpsonville
- Peggy Parish (1927–1988), born in Manning, author of Amelia Bedelia series
- Lu Parker, broadcast journalist and Miss USA 1994, from Anderson
- Mary-Louise Parker, film and television actress, born in Fort Jackson
- Ron Parker (born 1987), born in Saint Helena Island, safety for the Kansas City Chiefs
- Teyonah Parris (born 1987), born in Hopkins, actress, Mad Men, WandaVision
- David Patten (1974–2021), born in Hopkins, NFL wide receiver and three-time Super Bowl champion with the New England Patriots
- Cordarrelle Patterson (born 1991), born in Rock Hill, NFL utility player
- Will Patton (born 1954), actor, born in Charleston
- Carl Anthony Payne II (born 1969), actor, Martin, Rock Me Baby, The Cosby Show
- Teddy Pendergrass (born 1950), born in Kingstree, singer
- William "The Refrigerator" Perry, former professional football player, born in Aiken
- Julia Peterkin (1880–1961), born in Laurens County, Pulitzer Prize winner
- Bobbie Phillips (born 1972), actress, The Cape, Murder One
- Bill Pinkney (1925–2007), born in Dalzell, pitcher in the Negro leagues, served in World War II, performer and singer with The Drifters
- Joel Roberts Poinsett (1779–1851), born in Charleston, Martin Van Buren's secretary of war, physician, botanist, and statesman, as well as famous eponym
- Virginia Postrel (born 1960), political and cultural writer, born in Greenville
- Josh Powell, power forward and center for the Atlanta Hawks, born in Charleston
- Jeryl Prescott (born 1964), from Hartsville, actress
- Melvin Purvis (1903–1960), born in Timmonsville, FBI agent responsible for ending the criminal careers of Baby Face Nelson, Pretty Boy Floyd, and John Dillinger
- Brian Quick (born 1989), born in Columbia, wide receiver for the St. Louis Rams
- Robert Quinn (born 1990), from Ladson, defensive end for the Dallas Cowboys
- Willie Randolph (born 1954), born in Holly Hill, MLB player, manager, third base coach for the Baltimore Orioles
- Arthur Ravenel Jr. (born 1927), born in Charleston, Republican politician
- Arizona Reid (born 1986), Israeli National League basketball player
- Hunter Renfrow (born 1995), born in Myrtle Beach, NFL wide receiver
- Thomas C. Reynolds (1821–1887), born in Charleston, Confederate governor of Missouri 1862–1865
- Flint Rhem (1901–1969), Major League Baseball pitcher
- Don Rhymer (1961–2012), born in Union, film writer and producer
- Jim Rice (born 1953), born in Anderson, MLB left fielder/designated hitter, member of the Baseball Hall of Fame
- Sidney Rice (born 1986), born in Gaffney, NFL wide receiver for the Minnesota Vikings and Seattle Seahawks
- Bobby Richardson (born 1935), born in Sumter, MLB player for the New York Yankees, three-time World Series champion
- Richard Wilson Riley (born 1933), governor of South Carolina, U.S. secretary of education 1993–2001
- Leon Rippy (born 1949), born in Rock Hill, film and television actor
- Jane Robelot (born 1960), in Greenville, Co Anchor CBS This Morning
- Andre Roberts (born 1988), born in Columbia, football player for the Arizona Cardinals
- Julie Roberts (born 1979), from Lancaster, country music singer
- Bobby Robinson (1917–2011), born in Union, record producer
- Eugene Robinson (born 1955), born in Orangeburg, Pulitzer Prize-winning newspaper columnist
- Chris Rock (born 1965), born in Andrews, comedian, actor, screenwriter, film, TV producer, and director
- Thomas A. Roe (1927–2000), born in Greenville, businessman and conservative philanthropist
- Joshua Rogers (born 1994), born in Greeleyville, recording artist, Season 5 winner of BET's Sunday Best
- Arthur Rose Sr. (1921–1995), born in Charleston, Chair of the Art Department at Claflin University, Orangeburg (1952–1973)
- Al Rosen (1924–2015), born in Spartanburg, 4x All Star and MVP baseball player
- Mackenzie Rosman (born 1989), born in Charleston, actress, 7th Heaven
- Darius Rucker (born 1966), born in Charleston, musician, lead singer of Hootie & The Blowfish, now a solo artist
- Thomas Jefferson Rusk (1803–1857), born in Pendleton; early political and military leader of the Republic of Texas
- Edward Rutledge (1749–1800), youngest signer of the Declaration of Independence; later governor of South Carolina
- Francis H. Rutledge (1799–1866), born in Charleston, first Episcopal bishop of Florida
- John Rutledge (1739–1800), statesman and judge, elected president of South Carolina, April 1776, under the constitution drawn up on March 26, 1776
- Deebo Samuel (born 1996), born in Inman, NFL wide receiver
- Reggie Sanders (born 1967), born in Florence, professional baseball player
- Gloria Saunders (1927–1980), actress, born in Columbia
- Jake Scott (1945–2020), born in Greenwood, former safety for the Miami Dolphins and Washington Redskins
- O'Brien Schofield (born 1987), born in Camden, outside linebacker for the Atlanta Falcons
- Ian Scott (born 1981), born in Greenville, football player, defensive tackle for the San Diego Chargers
- Ramon Sessions (born 1986), born in Myrtle Beach, basketball player for the NBA
- Richard Seymour (born 1979), born in Gadsden, football player, defensive lineman for the New England Patriots and Oakland Raiders, three-time Super Bowl champion and seven-time Pro Bowl selection
- Mike Sharperson (1961–1996), baseball player, member of 1988 World Series champion Los Angeles Dodgers, born in Orangeburg
- Courtney Shealy (born 1977), born in Columbia, two-time Olympic gold medalist swimmer
- Art Shell (born 1946), born in Charleston, Pro Football Hall of Fame offensive tackle and head coach for the Oakland/Los Angeles Raiders
- Donnie Shell (born 1952), born in Whitmire, Pro Football Hall of Fame strong safety for the Pittsburgh Steelers, member of the Steelers famed Steel Curtain defense in the 1970s
- John Shumate (born 1952), born in Greenville, professional basketball player
- Robert Smalls (1839–1915), born in Beaufort, naval pilot during American Civil War, founder of South Carolina Republican Party
- Arthur Smith (1921–2014), born in Clinton, guitarist, songwriter, radio-TV personality, composer of "Guitar Boogie" and "Dueling Banjos"
- Shawnee Smith (born 1970), born in Orangeburg, film and television actress, musician
- J. Smith-Cameron (born 1955), raised in Greenville, stage and screen actress
- Justin Smoak (born 1986), born in Goose Creek, baseball player for the Toronto Blue Jays
- Louise Hammond Willis Snead (1870–1958), born in Charleston, artist, writer, lecturer, and composer
- Mickey Spillane (1918–2006), lived in Murrells Inlet, crime novel author, many featuring fictional detective Mike Hammer
- Josephine Sprott (1867–1952), lived in Manning, president, Woman's Christian Temperance Union of South Carolina
- Jay Stamper (born 1972), Democratic candidate for U.S. Senate, resident of Columbia
- John Steadman (1909–1993), born in Lexington, radio personality and actor; played "Pop" in The Longest Yard
- Zak Stevens (born 1966), born in Columbia, lead singer in the heavy metal band Savatage, backup singer for Trans-Siberian Orchestra and lead singer for Circle II Circle
- Melvin Stewart (born 1968), raised in Fort Mill, Olympic swimmer, SwimSwam co-founder
- Jessica Stroup (born 1986), born in Anderson, actress, 90210, The Following, Ted

== T–Z ==
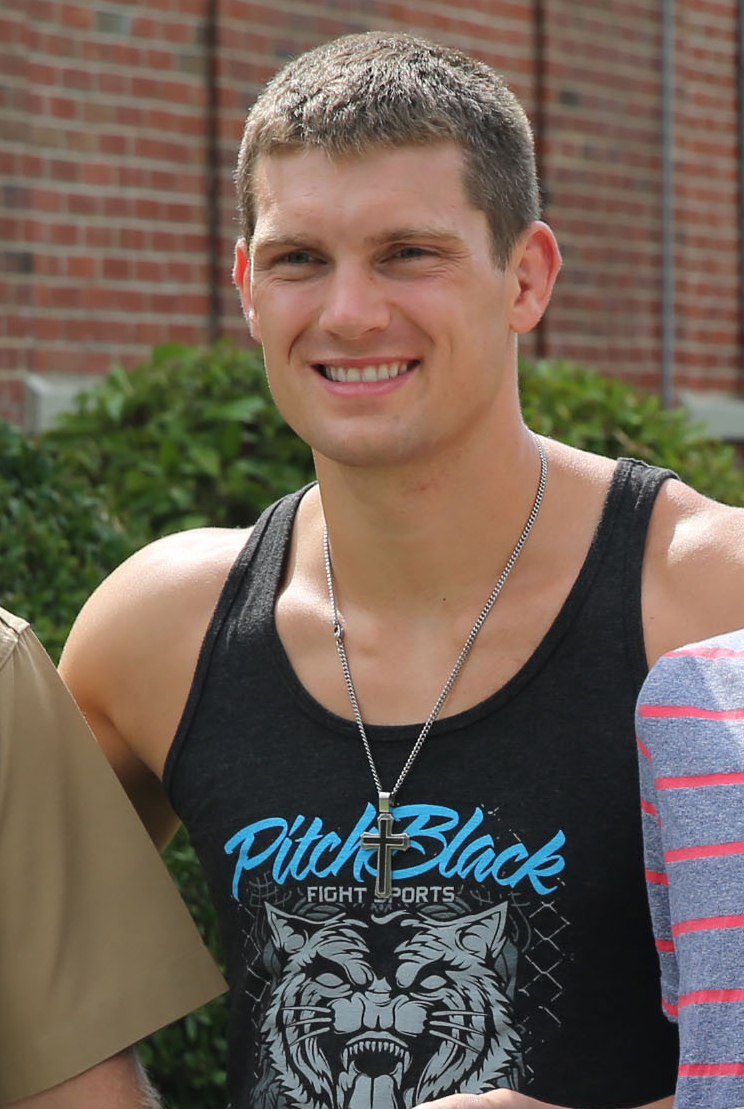
Stephen Thompson

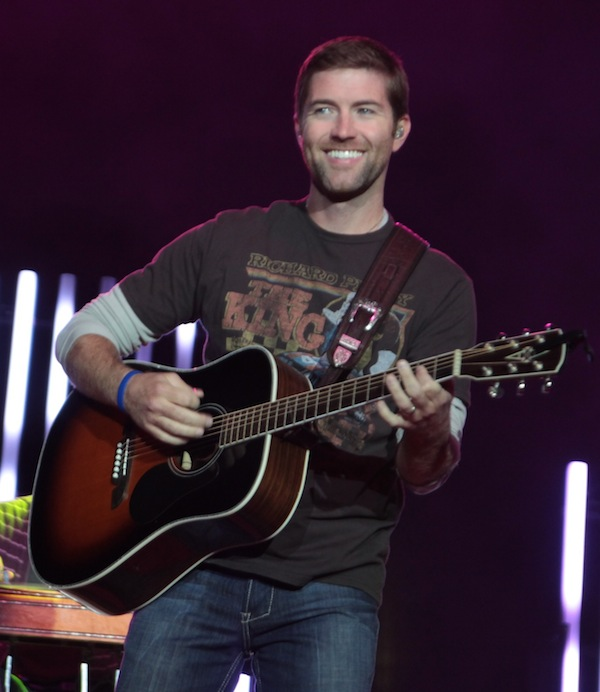
Josh Turner

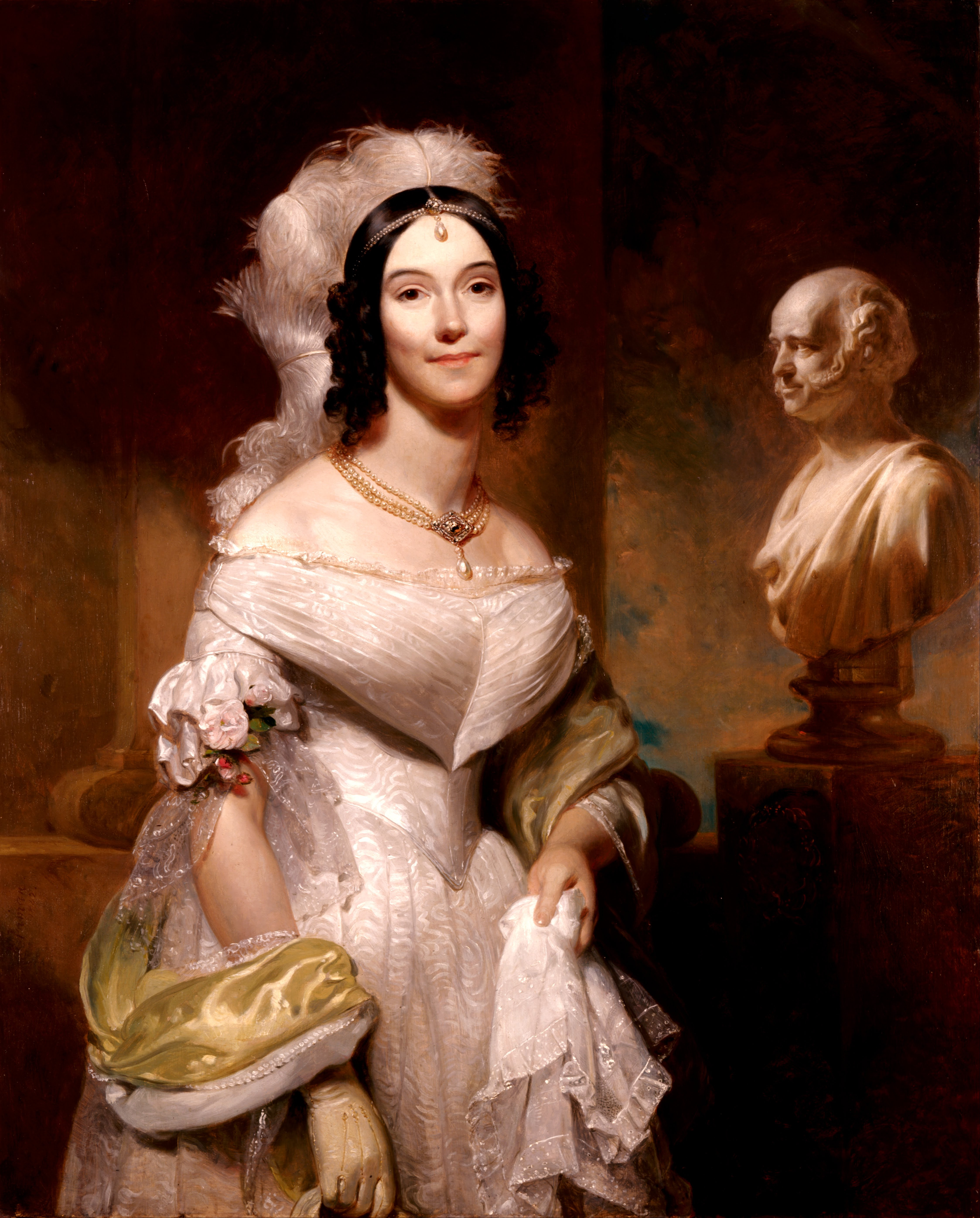
Angelica Singleton Van Buren

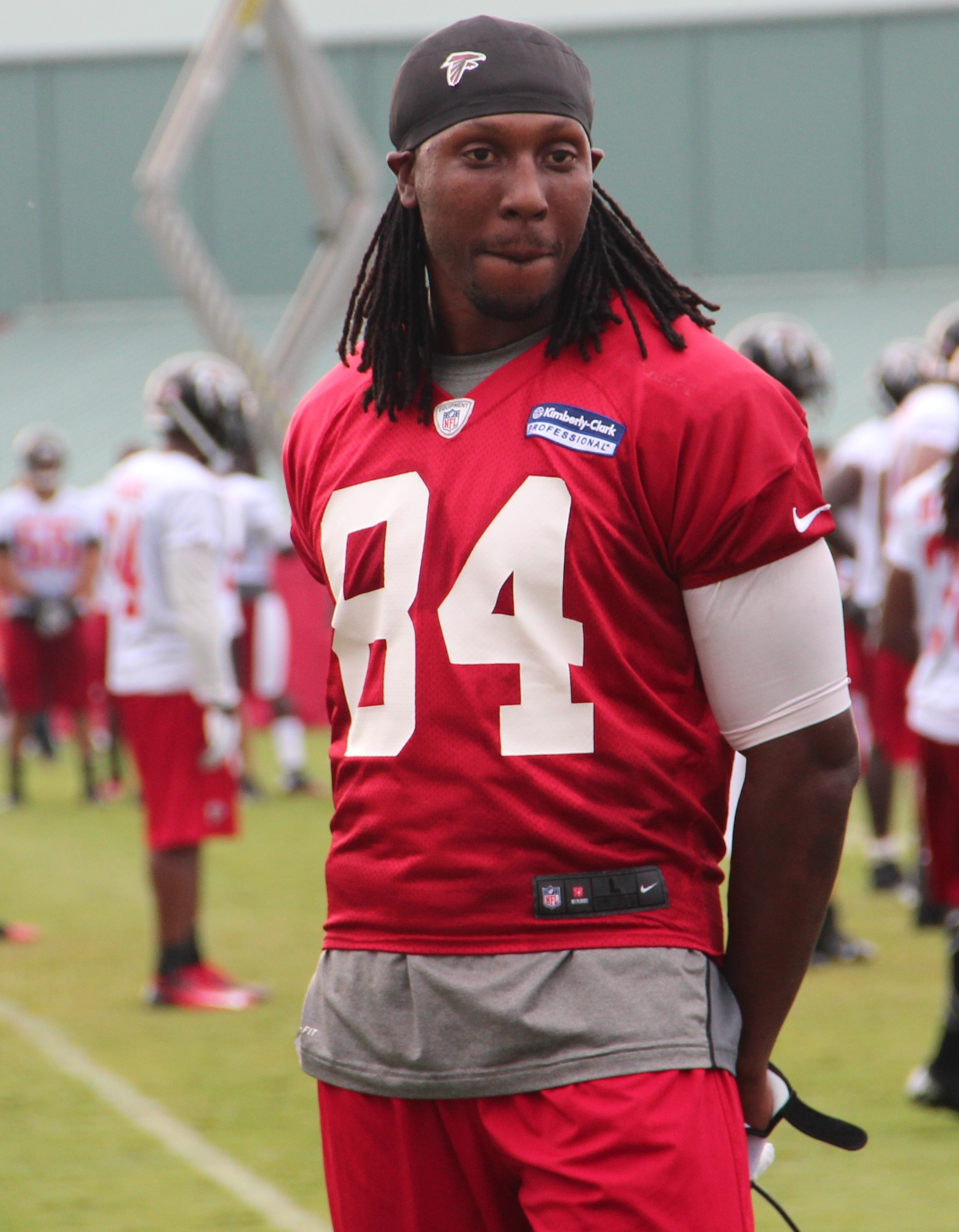
Roddy White

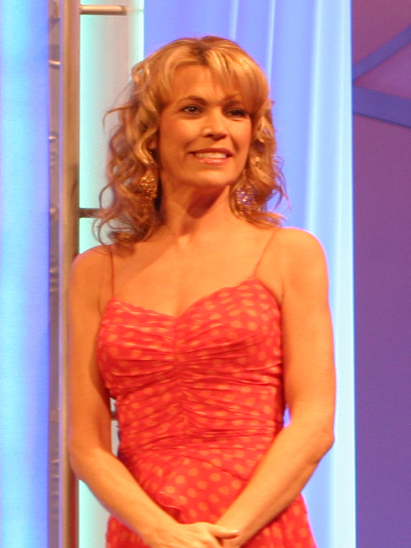
Vanna White

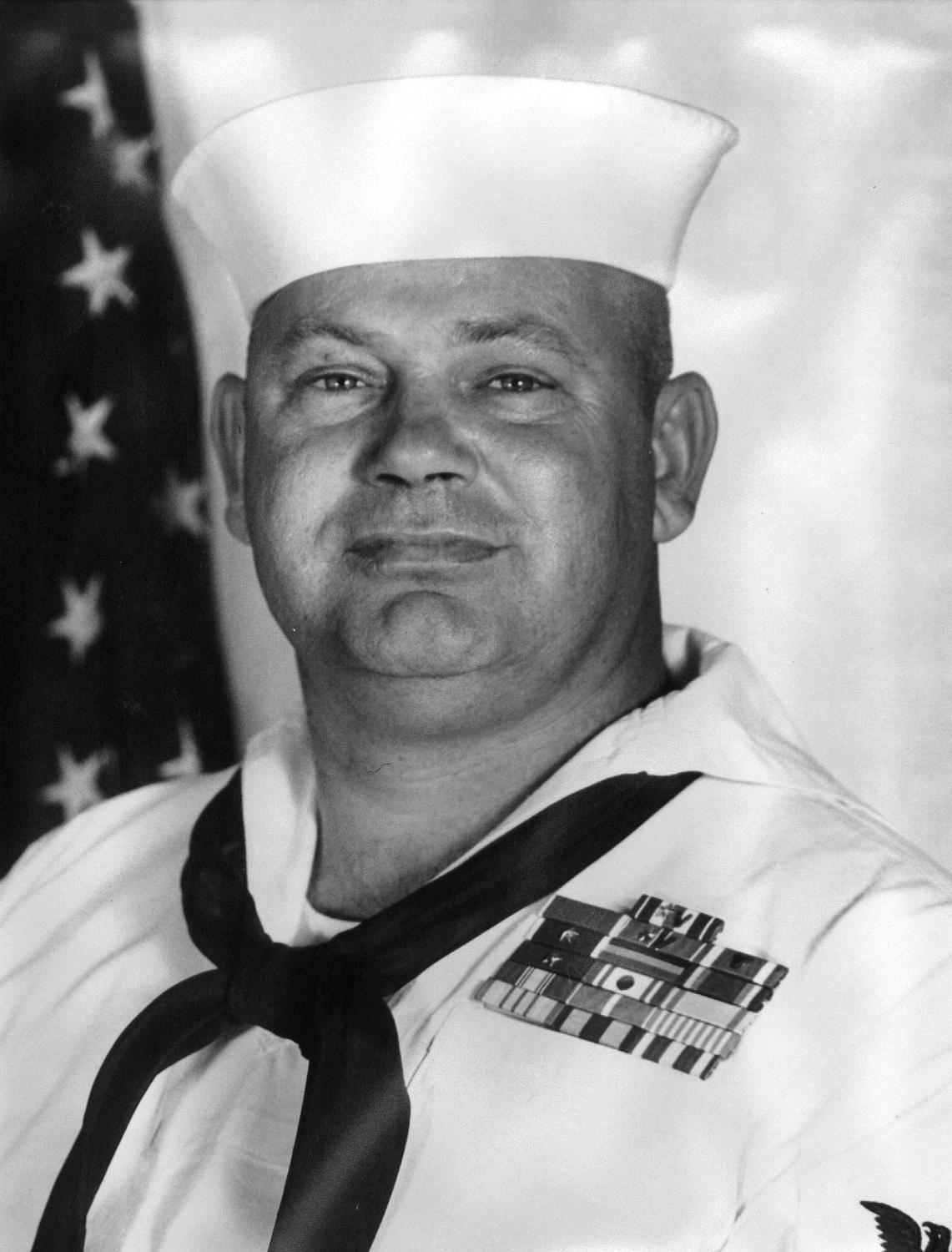
James E. Williams

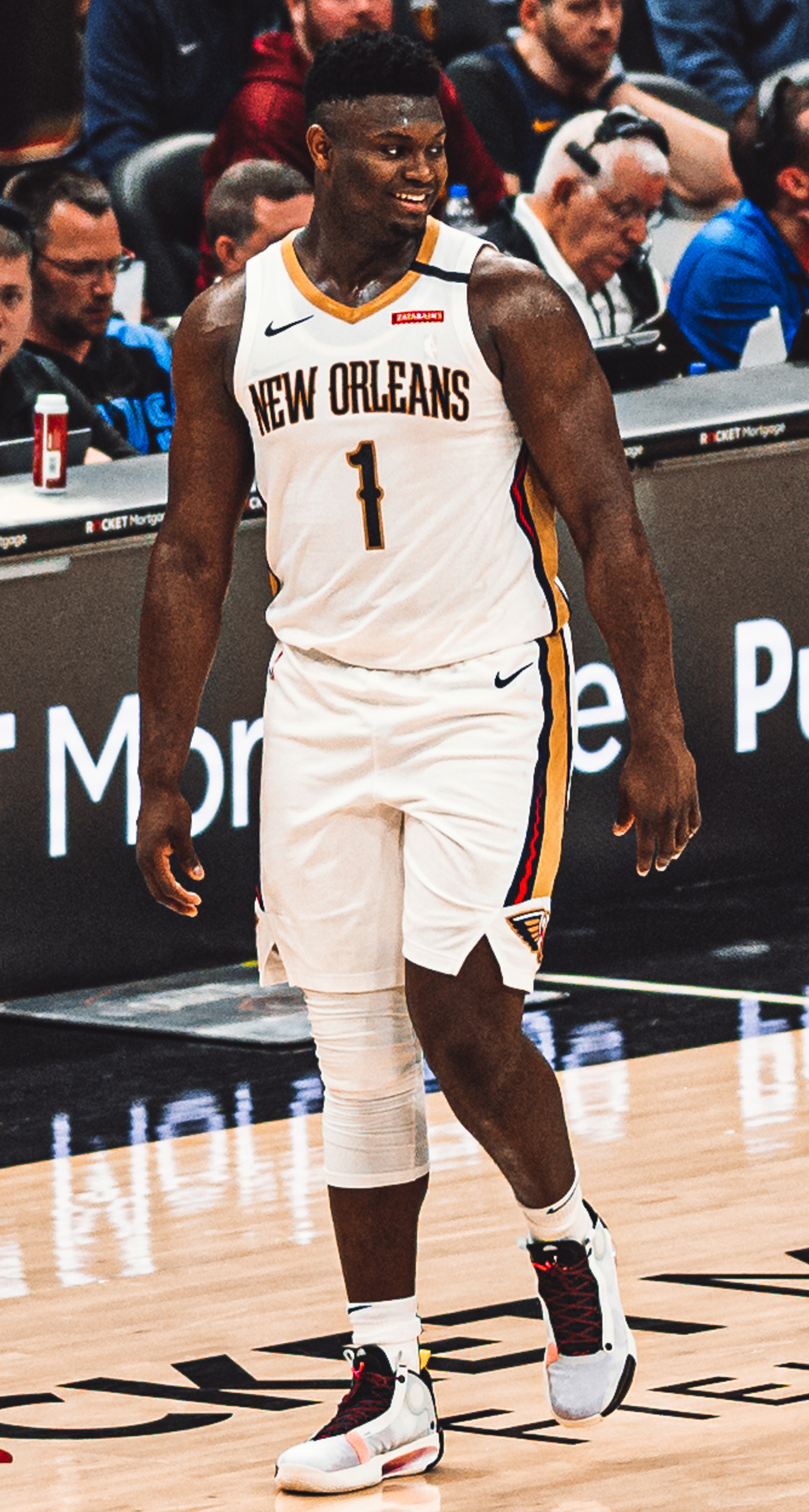
Zion Williamson

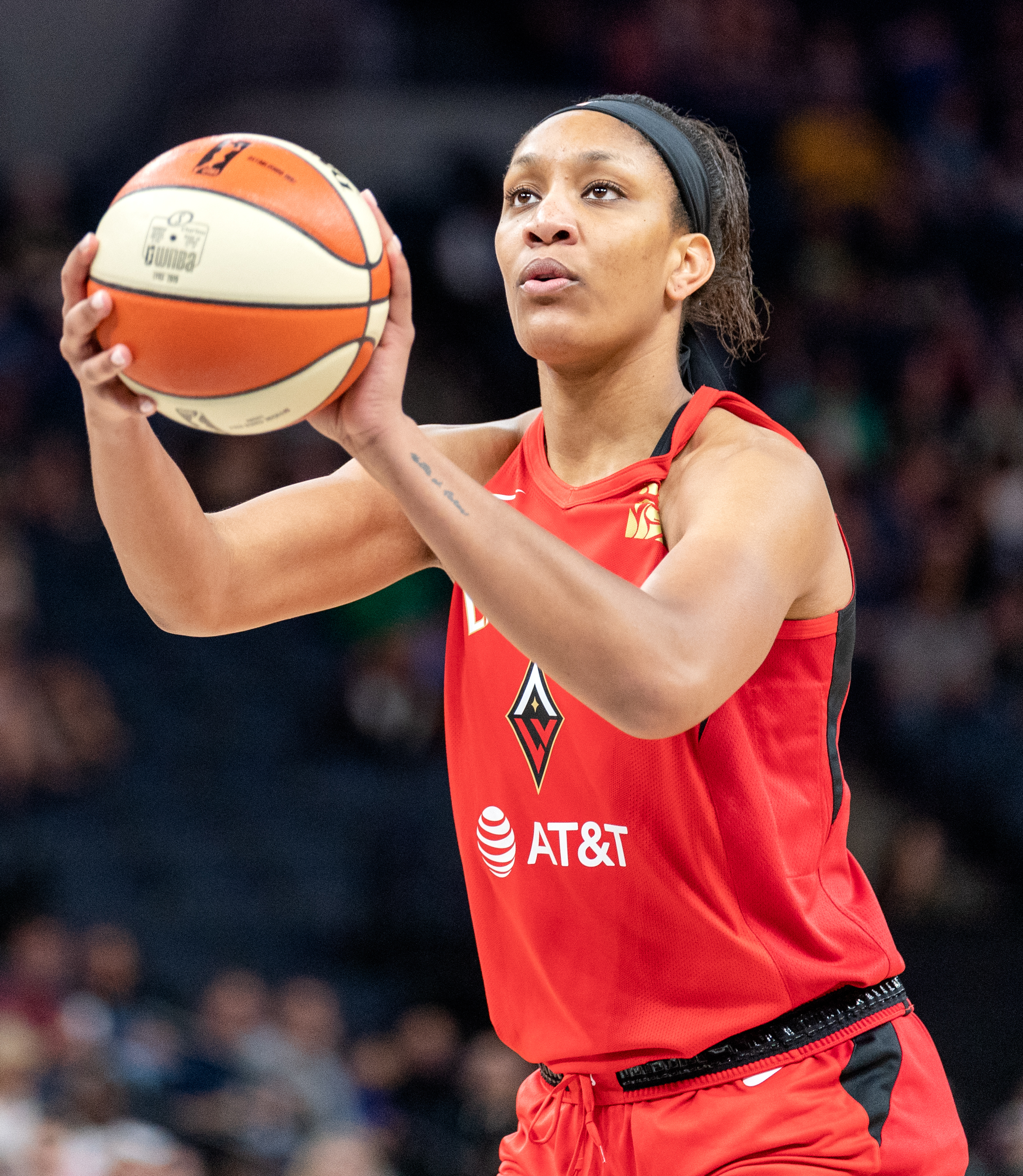
A'ja Wilson

- Devin Taylor (born 1989), from Lady's Island; defensive end for the Detroit Lions
- James "JT" Taylor (born 1953), from Laurens; lead singer of Kool & the Gang
- Tyler Thigpen (born 1984), from Winnsboro; quarterback for the Buffalo Bills
- Brandon Thomas (born 1991), from Spartanburg; offensive guard for the San Francisco 49ers
- Gorman Thomas (born 1950), from Charleston; former outfielder for the Milwaukee Brewers, Cleveland Indians, and Seattle Mariners
- Stephen Thompson (born 1983), from Simpsonville; kickboxer and UFC fighter
- David Thornton (born 1953), from Cheraw; television actor
- Melanie Thornton (1967–2001), born in Charleston; Eurodance singer for La Bouche, famous for the singles "Be My Lover" and "Sweet Dreams"
- Strom Thurmond (1902–2003), born in Edgefield; South Carolina governor, and the oldest and 2nd longest-serving U.S. senator
- Kelly Tilghman (born 1969), from North Myrtle Beach; broadcaster for The Golf Channel, and the PGA Tour's first female lead golf announcer
- Lawrence Timmons (born 1986), from Florence; linebacker for the Pittsburgh Steelers
- Gina Tolleson (born 1970), from Spartanburg; model and beauty queen crowned Miss World America 1990
- Steven Tolleson (born 1983), from Spartanburg; infielder for the Baltimore Orioles
- Charles Townes (1915–2015), from Greenville; Nobel Prize-winning physicist and educator
- William Barret Travis (1809–1836), born in Saluda County; 19th-century American lawyer and soldier who commanded Texan forces at the Alamo
- Josh Turner (born 1977), from Hannah; country music singer
- Tom Turnipseed (1936–2020), lived in Columbia; lawyer, executive director of the 1968 presidential campaign of George C. Wallace, former member of the South Carolina State Senate
- Angelica Singleton Van Buren (1818–1877), born in Wedgefield; married Abraham Van Buren while his father, Martin Van Buren, was the eighth president of the United States; served as First Lady of the United States for the rest of his term in the White House
- Denmark Vesey (c.1767–1822), lived in Charleston; African-American leader
- Rodney Wallace (born 1981), born in Bamberg, UFC fighter
- Corey Washington (born 1991), from North Charleston; wide receiver for the New York Giants
- Benjamin Watson (born 1980), from Rock Hill; tight end for the New Orleans Saints
- John B. Watson (1878–1958), grew up in Travelers Rest; psychologist who established the psychological school of behaviorism
- Shawn Weatherly (born 1959), from Sumter; Miss USA and Miss Universe 1980
- Sean Weatherspoon (born 1987), from Greenville; linebacker for the Arizona Cardinals
- Charles S. West (1829–1885), born in Camden; Texas jurist and politician
- John C. West (1922–2004), politician
- William C. Westmoreland (1914–2005), born in Saxon; deputy commander of Military Assistance Command, Vietnam (MACV) 1964–1968, Army chief of staff 1968–1972
- Celia Weston (born 1951), from Spartanburg; character actress
- Lily C. Whitaker (c. 1850–1932), born in Charleston; educator and author
- Mary Scrimzeour Whitaker (1820–1906), born in Beaufort; litterateur, writer, poet, and novelist
- Chris White (born 1983), from Chester; guard and center for the Seattle Seahawks
- Roddy White (born 1981), from James Island; football player, wide receiver for the Atlanta Falcons
- Tracy White (born 1981), from Charleston; linebacker for the New England Patriots
- Vanna White (born 1957), from North Myrtle Beach; co-host on Wheel of Fortune
- Johnson Chesnut Whittaker (1858–1931), from Camden; one of the first black men to win an appointment to the United States Military Academy at West Point
- Johnny Whitworth (born 1975), from Charleston; actor, CSI: Miami, The 100, Limitless
- Matt Wieters (born 1986), from Goose Creek; catcher for the St. Louis Cardinals
- Louis Wigfall (1816–1874), born in Edgefield; Texas politician who served as a member of the Texas Legislature, United States Senate, and Confederate Senate
- Armstrong Williams (born 1959), from Marion; television and radio host, columnist, political activist
- Dennis Williams (born 1965); basketball player
- James E. Williams (1930–1999), born in Fort Mill, raised in Darlington; Medal of Honor (Vietnam, 1966), most decorated enlisted man in the history of the U.S. Navy, U.S. marshal
- Zion Williamson (born 2000), raised in Spartanburg; No.1 pick in NBA Draft, NBA player for New Orleans Pelicans
- A'ja Wilson (born 1996), born in Hopkins; basketball player for the Las Vegas Aces, 2x WNBA MVP
- Mookie Wilson (born 1956), from Bamberg; former center fielder for the New York Mets and Toronto Blue Jays
- Rod Wilson (born 1981), from Cross; linebacker for the Chicago Bears
- Woodrow Wilson (1856–1924), 28th president of the United States; lived in Columbia in his teenage years
- DeWayne Wise (born 1978), from Columbia; outfielder for the Chicago White Sox
- Rosa Louise Woodberry (1869–1932), journalist, educator; born in Barnwell County; lived in Williston
- Henry Woodward (1646–1690), an early colonist of South Carolina who was instrumental in establishing contact with Native Americans and setting up a trading system
- Bill Workman (1940–2019), born in Charleston, mayor of Greenville 1983–1995, retired economic development specialist; resident of Walterboro
- Isaac Wright Jr. (born 1962), lawyer; born in Moncks Corner
- Mike Wright (born 1990), from Bennettsville; pitcher for the Baltimore Orioles
- Samuel E. Wright (1946–2021), from Camden; actor and Broadway performer
- Cale Yarborough (1939–2023), from Timmonsville; 3x NASCAR Cup Series champion
- Lee Thompson Young (1984–2013), born in Columbia; actor, The Famous Jett Jackson, Rizzoli & Isles

== See also ==
- List of South Carolina suffragists

By educational institution affiliation

- List of Bob Jones University people
- List of alumni of Clemson University
- List of College of Charleston people
- List of University of South Carolina people

By governmental position

- List of governors of South Carolina
- List of justices of the South Carolina Supreme Court
- List of lieutenant governors of South Carolina
- List of United States representatives from South Carolina
- List of United States senators from South Carolina

By location

- List of people from Charleston, South Carolina
- List of people from Columbia, South Carolina
