= Campus of Stony Brook University =

College campus in Stony Brook, New York, US

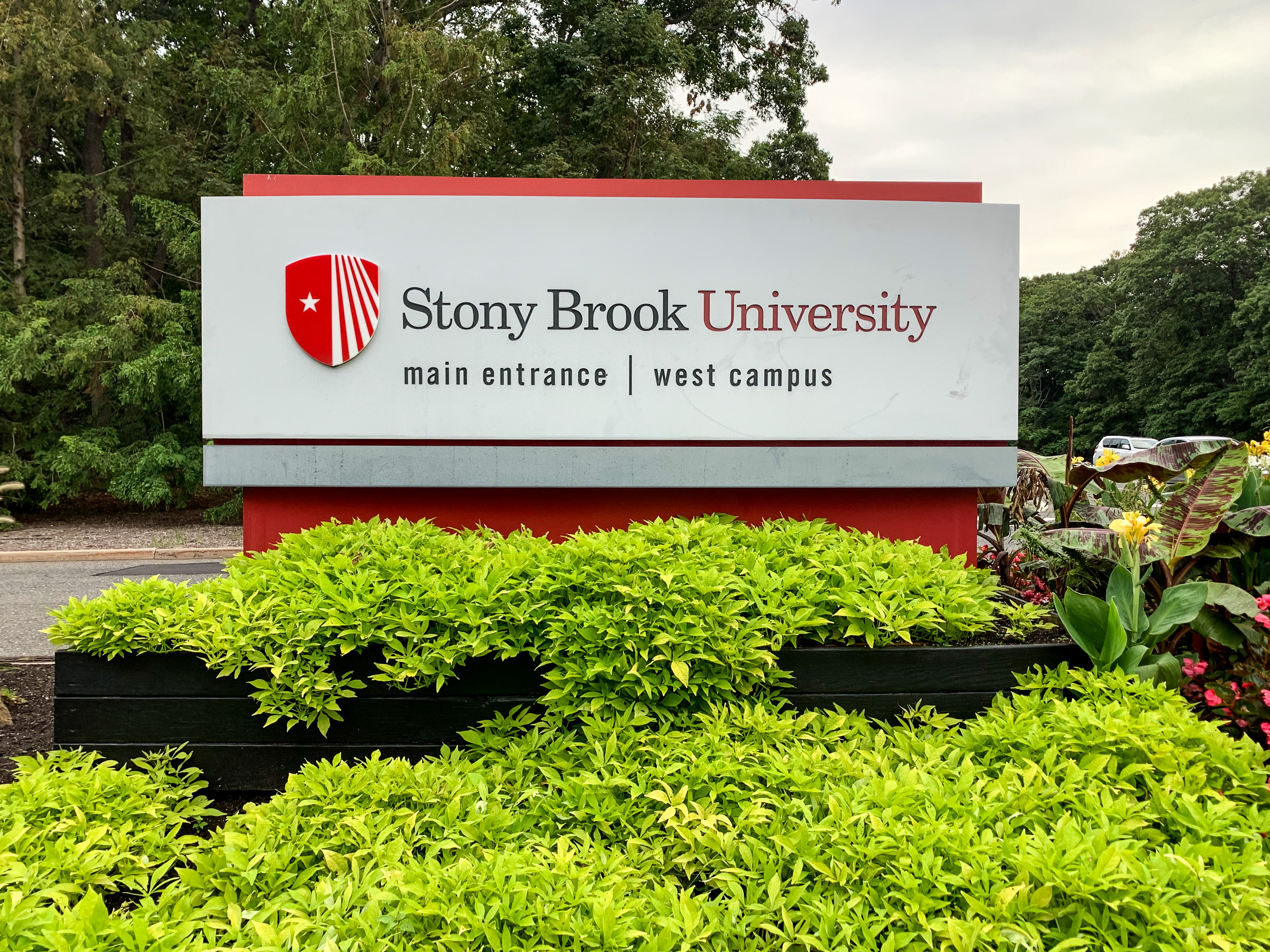
A sign designating an entrance to Stony Brook University's west campus

The campus of Stony Brook University in Stony Brook, New York, consists of 213 buildings over 1,454 acres (588 ha) of land. It is the largest public university in the state of New York in terms of land area. The campus was moved to Stony Brook in 1962 after originating in Oyster Bay, New York.

The Stony Brook University campus area is a census-designated place (CDP), with a population of 10,409 at the 2020 census. As of the 2020 census, the U.S. Census Bureau defines the Stony Brook University CDP as a census-designated place separate from the CDP of Stony Brook. The Census Bureau began defining the Stony Brook University CDP in the 2010 census. In previous censuses, the Census Bureau did not place the university property in a CDP.

The municipality containing the university is Town of Brookhaven. The university is not located in a village.

The campus is divided into numerous sections, with County Route 97 (Nicolls Road) dividing the university's West and East campuses. The West Campus, centered around the Academic Mall, includes many of the university's academic buildings, student dormitories and athletic facilities. The East Campus is centered around the Stony Brook University Hospital and other medical-related buildings such as the Health Sciences Center. Additional areas such as the university's Research and Development Park and its Southampton campus were acquired in the 2000s. The campus is bordered to the north and west by New York State Route 25A.

It is accessible via public transportation, with the Metropolitan Transportation Authority (MTA) operating the Stony Brook station of the Long Island Rail Road on campus. In addition to campus transportation provided by the university, the Suffolk County Transit bus also provides connection from the university to off-campus locations.

== History ==
Stony Brook University was founded in 1957 as the State University College of Long Island and was located in Oyster Bay, New York, before moving to Stony Brook in 1962. Businessman and philanthropist Ward Melville donated 482 acres of land to the Three Village area for a college campus that he envisioned as "Old World" and "pastoral".

The 2000s saw the campus expand with the acquisition of 246 acres of land adjacent to the university from the Gyrodyne Company of America; this area would be developed into the Stony Brook University Research and Development Park. In 2006, the university purchased an 81-acre plot of land formerly belonging to Southampton College and developed it into an additional campus 35 miles away from Stony Brook known as Stony Brook Southampton.

== West Campus ==
The West Campus of Stony Brook University is centered around the Academic Mall and includes many of the university's academic buildings, student dormitories and athletic facilities. The Academic Mall is described as "the heart of campus" and is where some of the university's most prominent structures are located near.

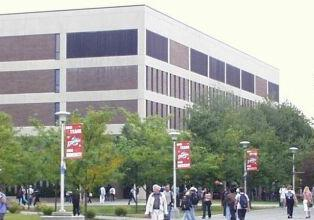
Frank Melville Jr. Memorial Library

=== Frank Melville Jr. Memorial Library ===
The Frank Melville Jr. Memorial Library is the main library at Stony Brook University's West Campus. It opened in 1963 and was soon expanded, more than quadrupling in size by 1971, when the building was dedicated to Frank Melville Jr., the father of Ward Melville. It is located toward the eastern end of the Academic Mall and houses over two million volumes, ranging from government documents to music and film collections. The building is six stories tall and the entire structure encompasses approximately 682,000 square feet of space. It is in use by over fifty different administrative and academic departments. The Melville Library is also home to retail stores such as Shop Red West, a university bookstore, a Starbucks coffee shop, Amazon@Stony Brook (the first Amazon pickup location in the state of New York) and FedEx.

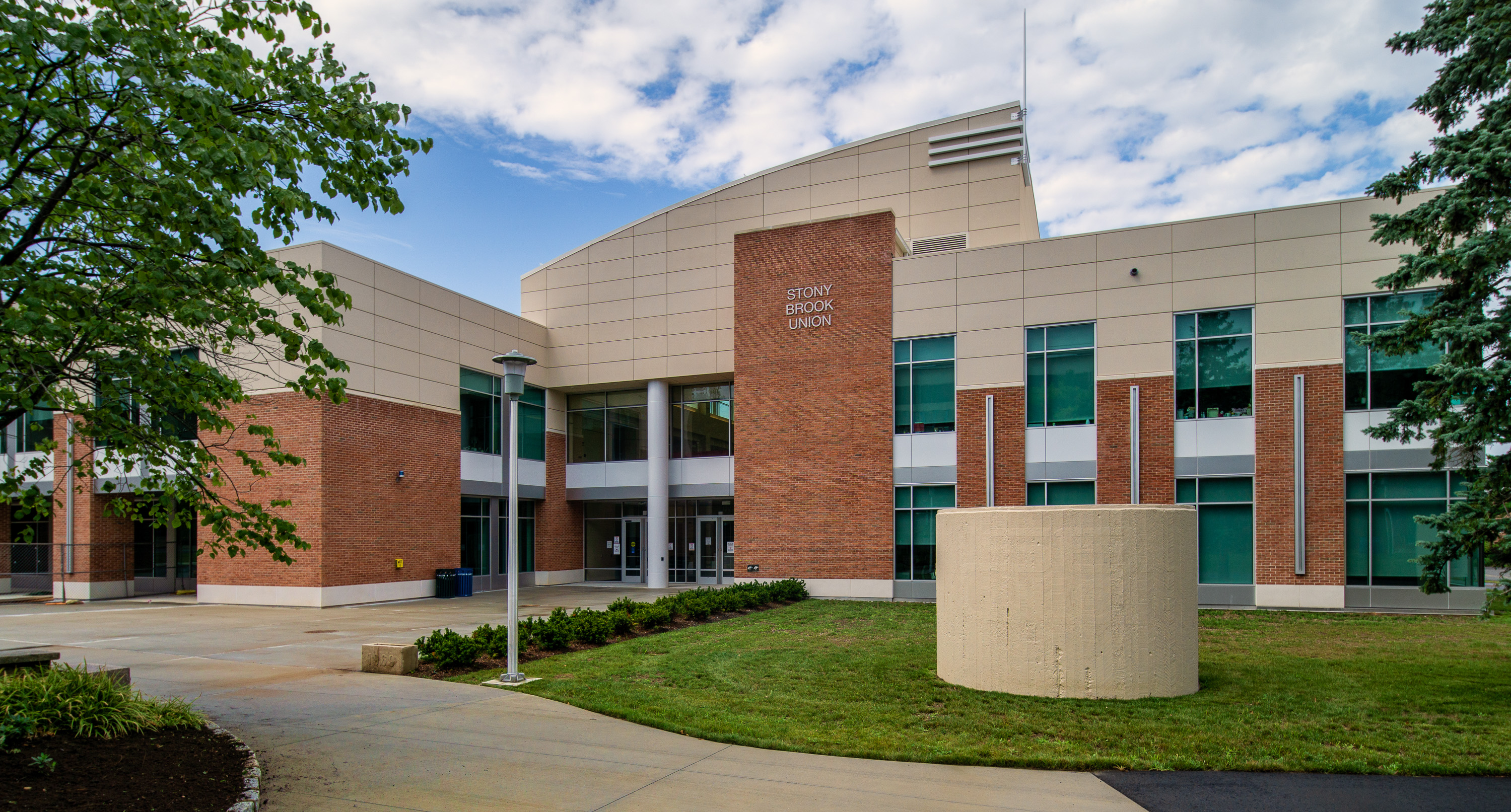
Stony Brook Union

=== Stony Brook Union ===
The Stony Brook Union is the main student union on campus, located on John S. Toll Drive. It opened in 1970 as the first building on campus dedicated specifically for student life. In the past, the building was known as the "living room of the campus" and home to facilities including a bowling alley, post office, bookstore and campus dining. It used to be the home of Stony Brook's college radio station WUSB as well as University Café, the last-standing bar on campus. The building closed in 2016 before undergoing a three-year, $63.4 million renovation, reopening in 2020. The new Union building is three stories tall, takes up 170,000 square feet and bears modernist and neoclassical architectural styles, with brick, stone, metal and glass finishes. It currently serves over 40 different student and faculty organizations.

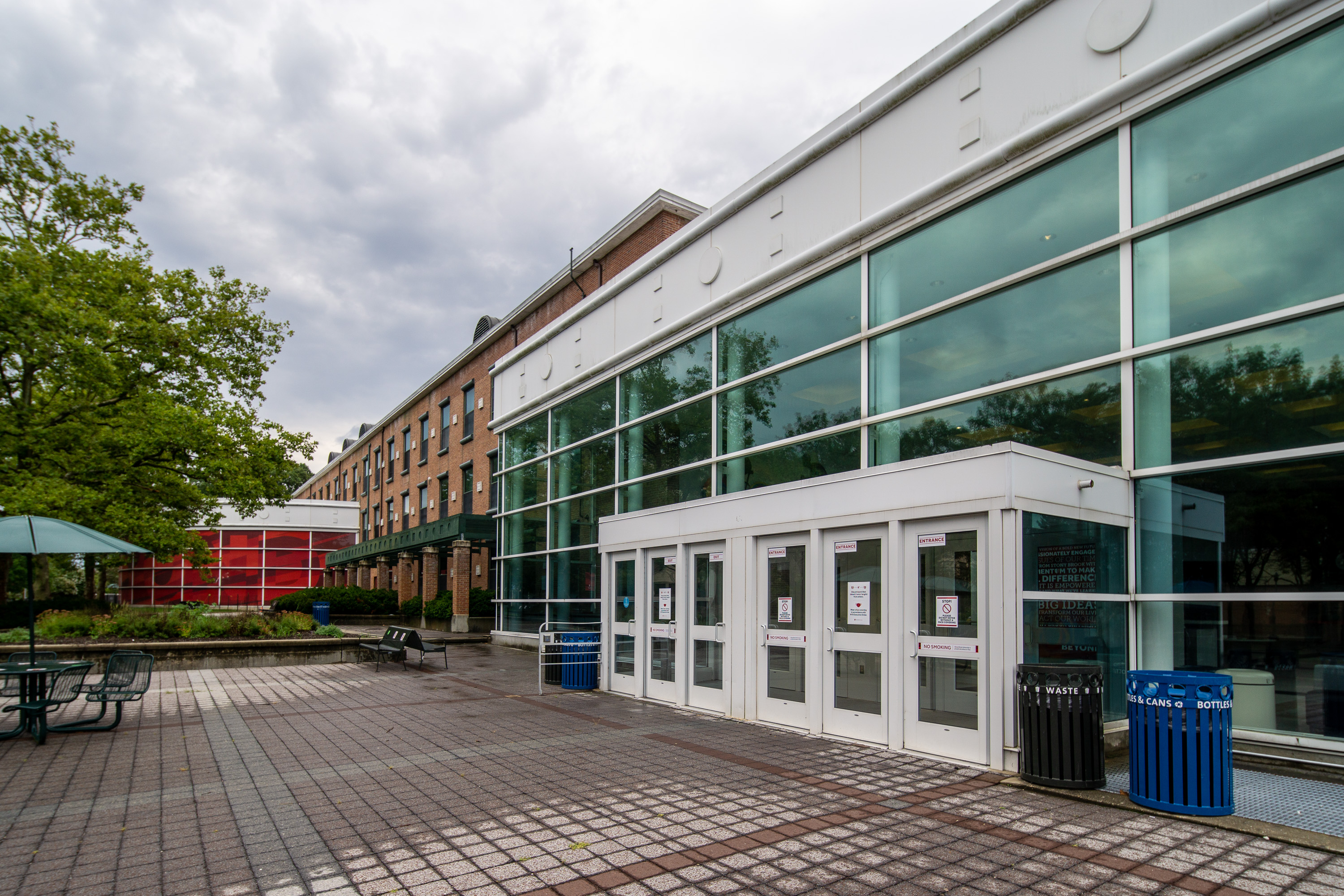
Student Activities Center

=== Student Activities Center ===
The Student Activities Center, commonly referred to by its acronym The SAC, is a student center located on the Academic Mall. It opened in 1997 and is referred to as "the focal point of the University." The four-story, 135,000-square foot building was designed by architect Kevin Hom, who sought to develop the building as "the portal to the campus", redesigning the Academic Mall and its adjacent roads, known as the Plaza, in order to accommodate the structure. It contains three event venues: two ballrooms and the Sidney Gelber Auditorium. Near the venues is the Sculpture Garden, an outdoor grass courtyard. The building is home to numerous dining options, including the SAC Food Court and the SAC Market, the latter of which opened in 2020. A media wing opened in 2016 to serve publications displaced by the closing of the old Union; it is currently the central location for the offices of student media organizations such as The Statesman.

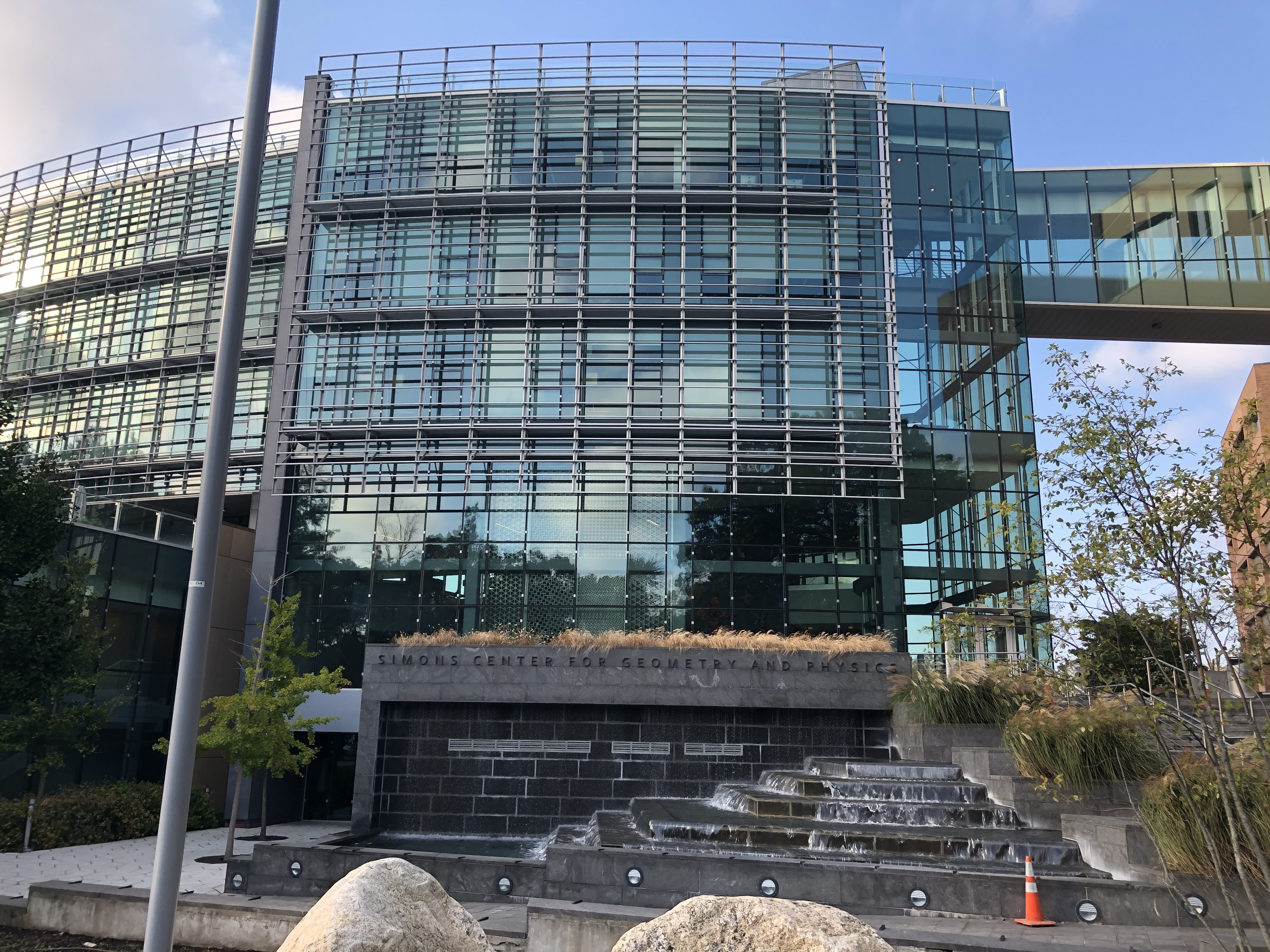
Simons Center for Geometry and Physics

=== Simons Center for Geometry and Physics ===
The Simons Center for Geometry and Physics is a center for theoretical math and physics. It opened in 2010 following a $60 million donation by multi-billionaire Jim Simons, the former chairman of the math department at Stony Brook University and the founder of hedge fund Renaissance Technologies. The donation was the largest to a school in the State University of New York system at the time. The university said that the mission of the Simons Center was “to bring together mathematicians, in particular geometers, and theoretical physicists, to inform and learn from each other, and to work on problems of common interest in order to transform each discipline.” The building stands six stories tall, occupies 39,000 square feet and cost $30 million to construct. It includes 35 faculty offices and space for supporting staff, a faculty commons room, conference rooms, a 250-seat lecture hall, an 80-100-seat seminar room, the Simons Center Café and an atrium. A bridge connects the Simons Center to the Math Tower.

=== Staller Center for the Arts ===
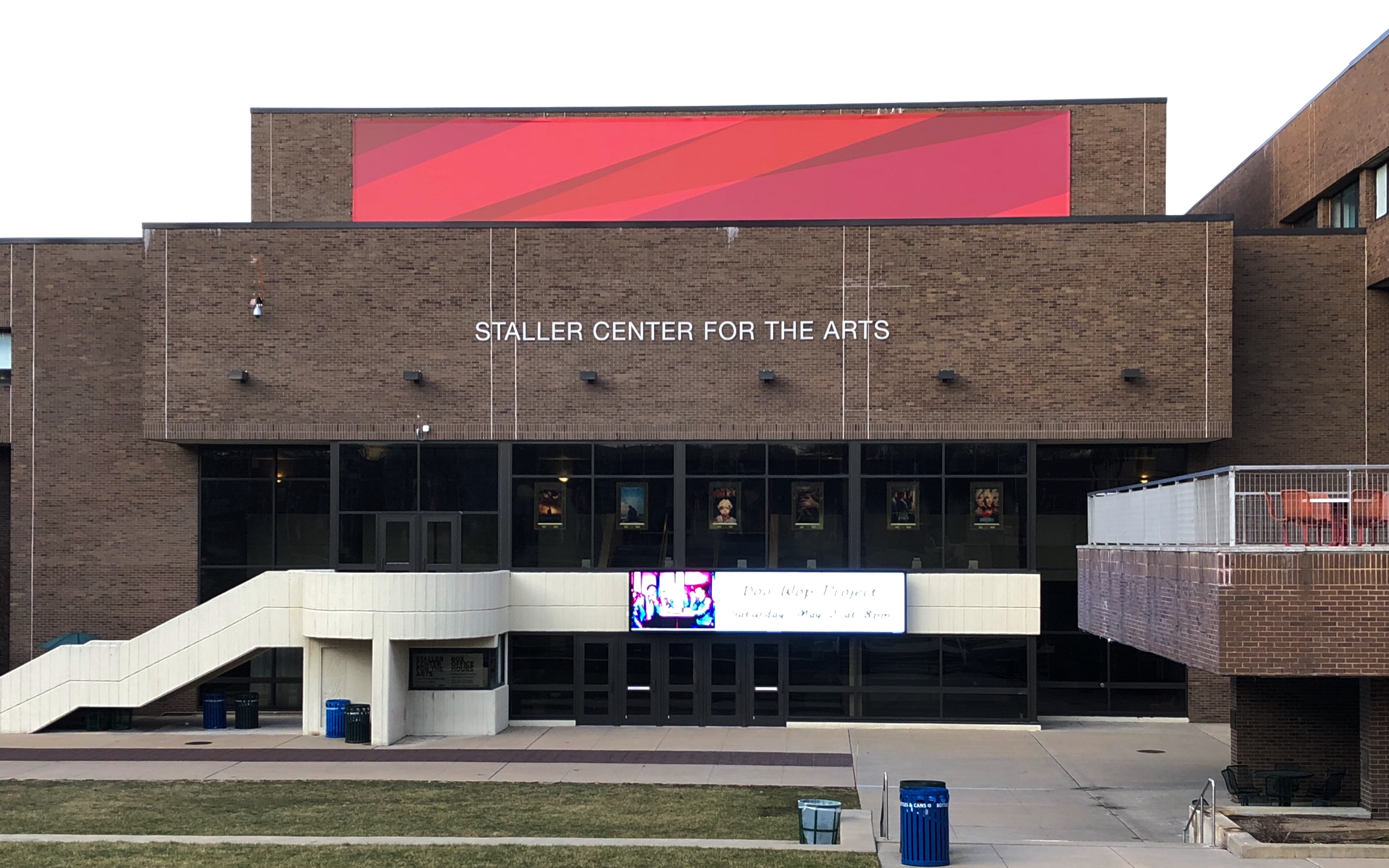
Staller Center for the Arts

The Staller Center for the Arts is the main arts building at Stony Brook. It opened in 1978 and was renamed in 1988 for the Staller family after a $1.8 million donation. It was the largest-ever private donation to the university at the time. The Staller Center is home to the Stony Brook Film Festival, an annual event which provides a program of independent films shown in the building's Main Stage. The festival draws crowds of over 14,000 and takes place over ten days. The Staller Center contains three black box theaters, a recital hall, and a professional 1,000-seat performance stage (the Main Stage) with a 40-foot movie screen. The screen is the largest on Long Island. Roughly 500 events take place in the Staller Center during each season. The Staller Center has hosted speakers and entertainers ranging from Bob Woodward, Bob Saget, Bill Cosby, David Sedaris, Stephanie Kelton, Spike Lee and Yo-Yo Ma. The Staller Center is also home to the Paul W. Zuccaire Gallery, a 5,000-square foot space that showcases professional and student exhibitions.

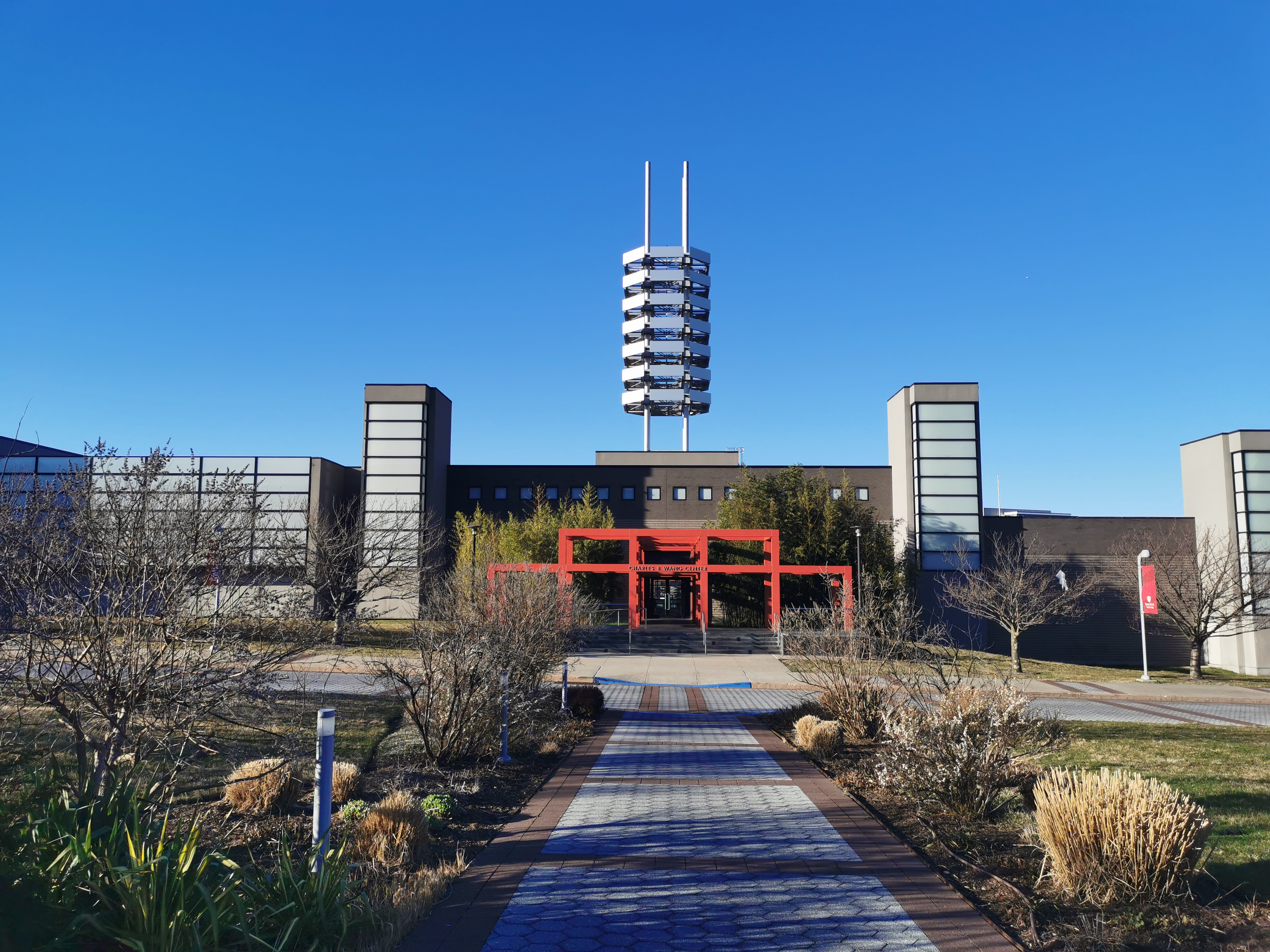
Charles B. Wang Center

=== Charles B. Wang Center ===
The Charles B. Wang Center is an Asian cultural center which opened in 2002 following a $52 million donation from New York Islanders owner and Computer Associates CEO Charles Wang, which at the time was the largest private donation to any school in the State University of New York system. It was designed by architect P.H. Tuan, who created the center for live performances, films, lectures, seminars, exhibits and other activities. The center hosts numerous art exhibits and cultural events. The center is 120,000 square feet and houses a theater, teleconferencing and lecture halls, galleries, a chapel, multi-use space and pools, gardens, atriums and courtyards for casual gatherings. The building is made of brick and white translucent glass panels designed to symbolize rice paper, which were used for windows in ancient Asian architecture. An 80-foot octagonal tower protruding from the center of the building's roof, which contains 20 roof lights and 56 layers of steel, was designed after an abstract pagoda. In the center's outdoor gardens, an arched bridge with steps is reminiscent of Shanghai temples. The Wang Center is also home to Jasmine, an East Asian food court, as well as Jasmine Market, a 550-square foot mini grocery store that sells international products.

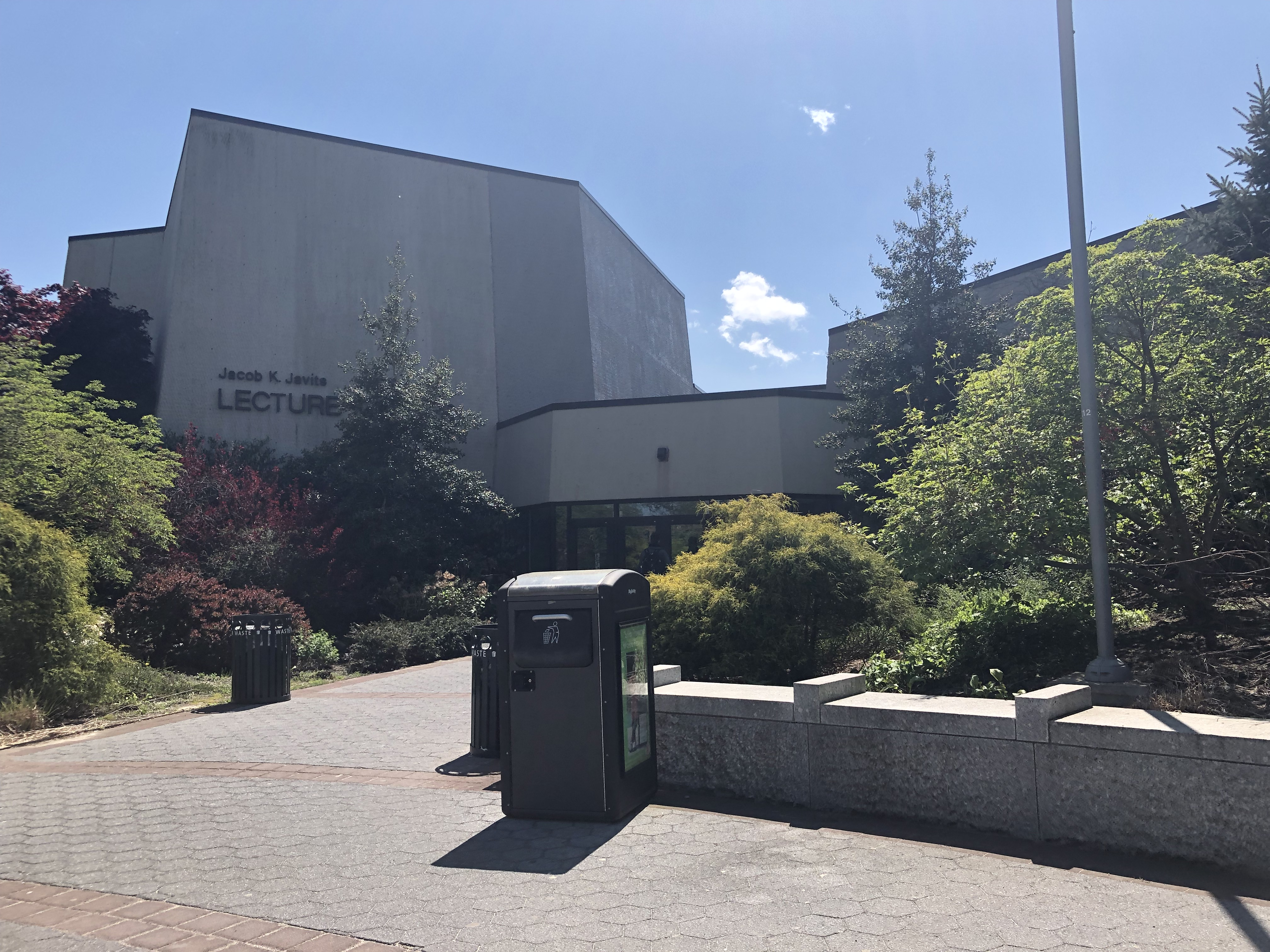
Jacob K. Javits Lecture Center

=== Jacob K. Javits Lecture Center ===
The Jacob K. Javits Lecture Center is one of the main lecture halls on Stony Brook's campus. It opened in 1969 and was named after New York senator Jacob Javits in 1984 "in honor of Senator Javits’ many contributions to education and Stony Brook University" at the suggestion of a student editor at Stony Brook's newspaper The Statesman. The Javits Center is located south of the Academic Mall and contains Javits 100, which is the largest lecture hall on campus, seating 570 people with an additional balcony. The Javits Center also has two 218-seat lecture halls and four 103-seat lecture halls.

The building notably has zero right angles aside from the doors. It underwent a significant $38 million renovation from 2021 to 2023 to modernize the building up to current mechanical, electrical, plumbing and ADA requirements.

=== Frey Hall ===
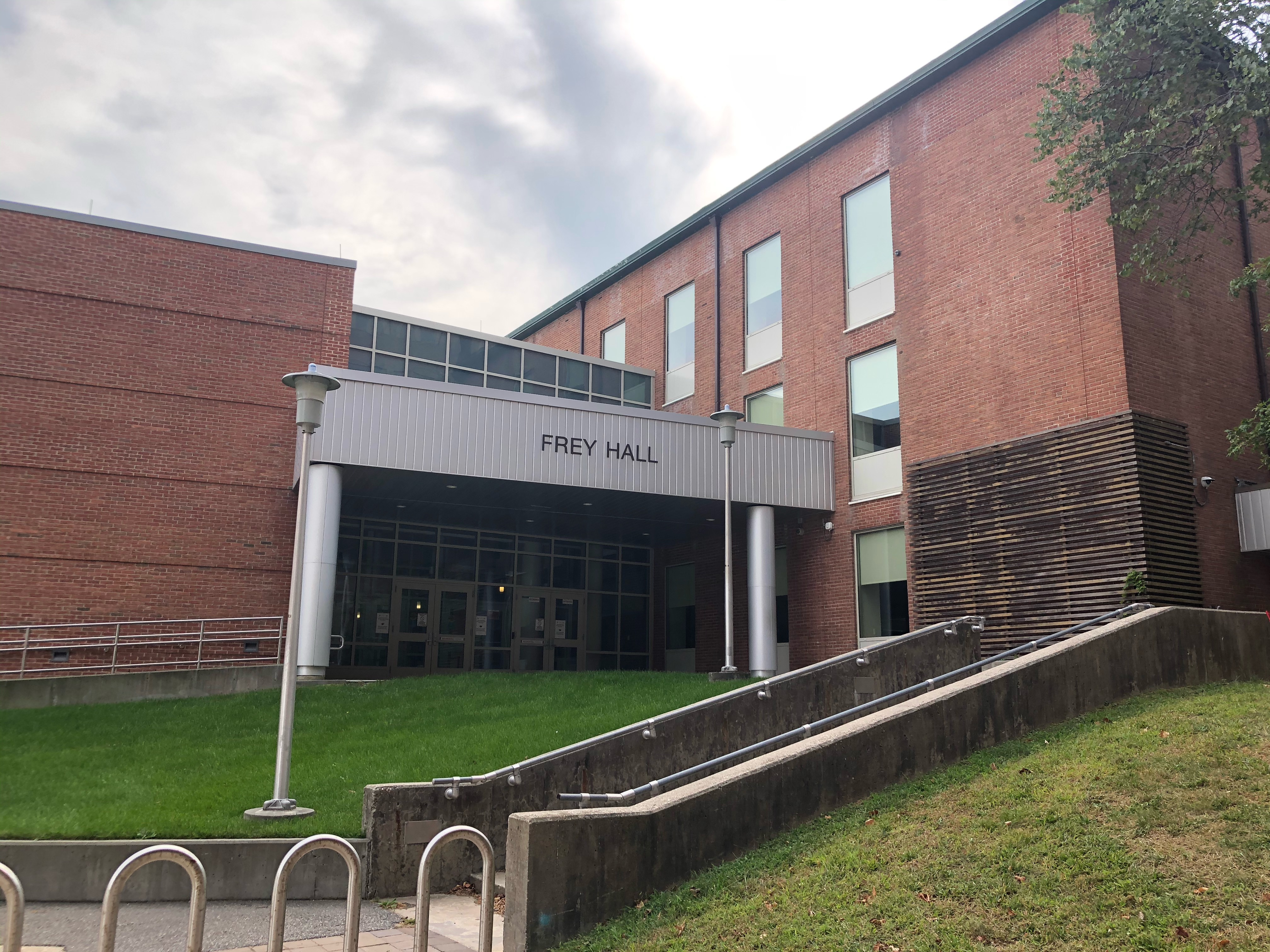
Frey Hall

Frey Hall, located between Harriman Hall and the Frank Melville Jr. Memorial Library, is the only building on the Stony Brook campus that is solely dedicated to classroom space. It opened in 2013 and was named after Robert J. Frey, a professor at Stony Brook and a former managing director at Renaissance Technologies, in recognition of his family foundation's gifts to the university. The building contains three large lecture halls on the first floor with roughly 250 capacity, and over two dozen classrooms, including a 193-seat active learning classroom and a 68-seat testing center with computers. The Old Chemistry building was shut down in 2011 in order to renovate the structure into Frey Hall.

=== Harriman Hall ===
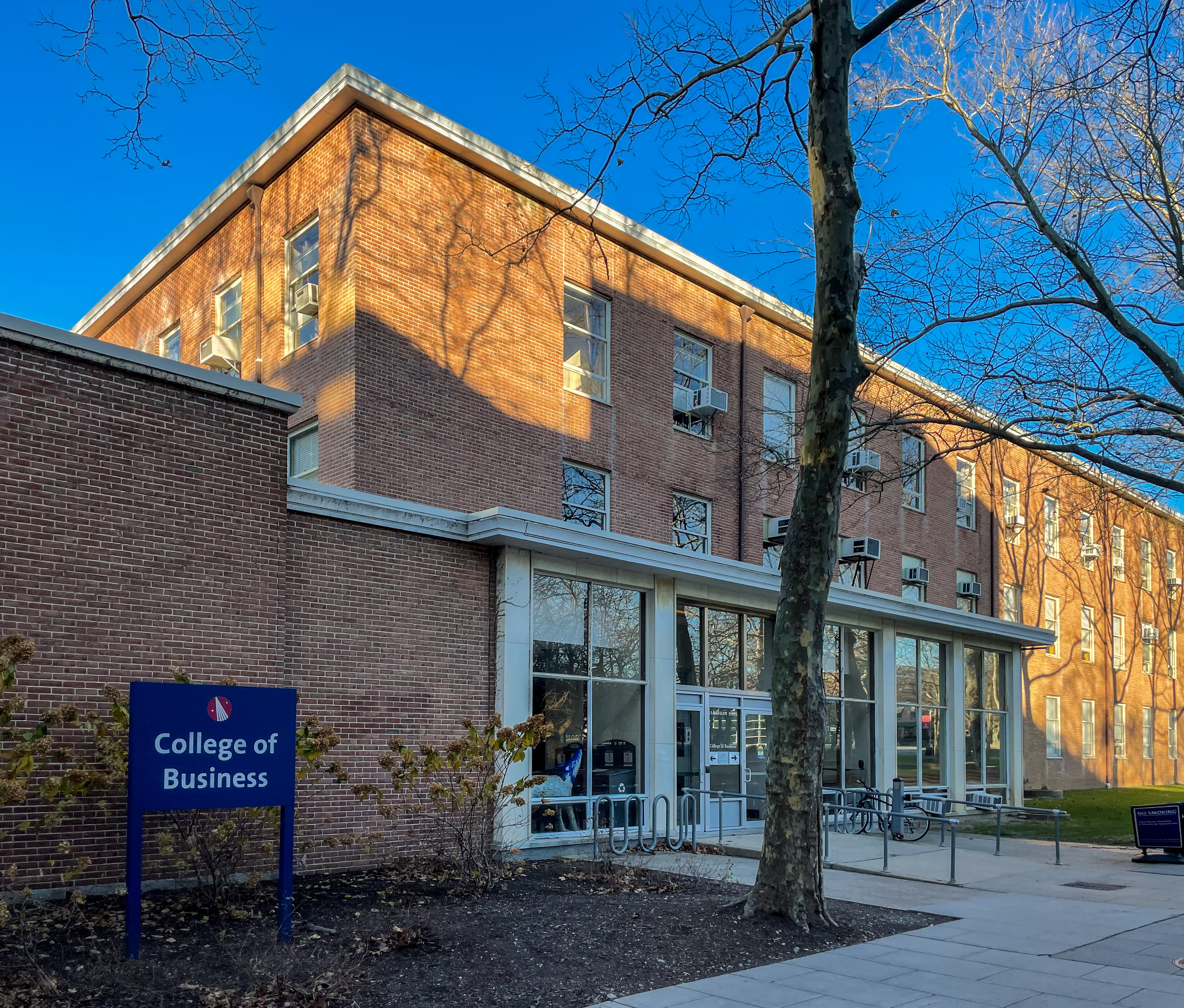
College of Business

Harriman Hall is home to the Department of Philosophy and the College of Business. It was built in 1975 as the W. Averell Harriman College for Urban and Policy Sciences, named after former New York governor W. Averell Harriman, with a cost of $5 million. It is located on the Academic Mall. The opening of Harriman Hall was said to heighten a rivalry between the public Stony Brook University and private colleges Adelphi University and Hofstra University, neither of which had, according to The New York Times, "a program as comprehensive as the one to be offered at Harriman College." Harriman Hall houses the Innovation Lab, which is partnered with iCREATE (formerly the Research and Technologies Department) and allows students to use machines for laser cutting, 3D printing, digital design, fabrication and sewing.

=== Earth and Space Sciences Building ===
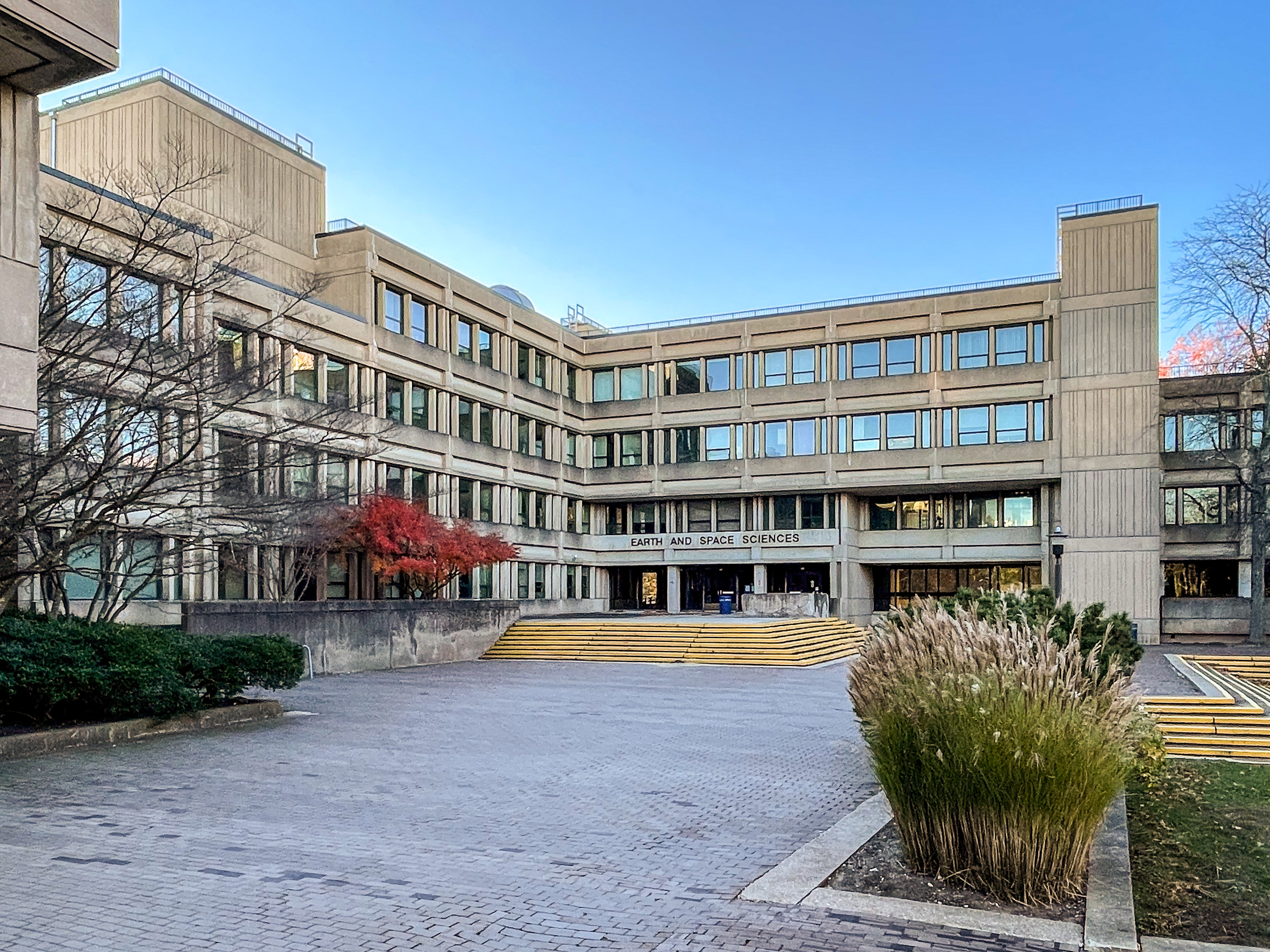
Earth and Space Sciences

The Earth and Space Sciences Building is home to the Department of Geosciences. It opened in 1967 and was designed by the IBI Group – Gruzen Samton architectural firm. It has a concrete facade of the béton brut style, and the building has been described as brutalist and modernist. The building was also the home of the Museum of Long Island Natural Sciences, which has hundreds of geological specimens, preserved Long Island sea and wildlife and Native American artifacts. The program was eliminated by 2017. The building is four stories tall and contains a rooftop astronomy observatory.

=== Ward Melville Social and Behavioral Sciences Building ===
The Ward Melville Social and Behavioral Sciences Building is one of the tallest buildings in Stony Brook's West Campus at seven stories tall. It opened in 1977 and was designed by architect Richard Thompson. In 1987, it was renamed after Ward Melville. Numerous departments have offices in the building including Political Science, Economics, and History. The building is split up into north and south wings and is located at the bottom of a hill between the Humanities and Life Sciences building.

=== Life Sciences Building ===
Life Sciences and Chemistry

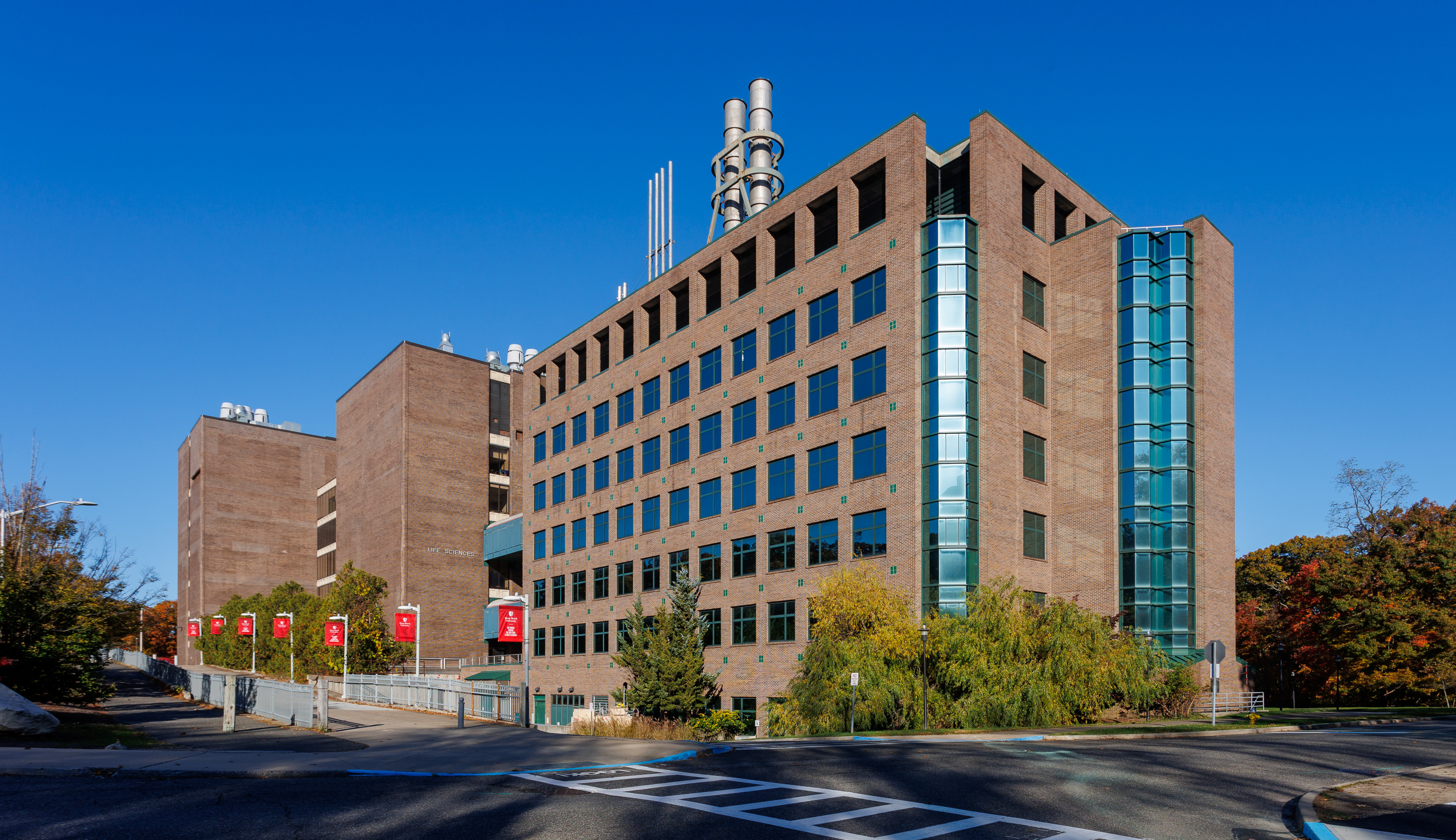
Life Sciences

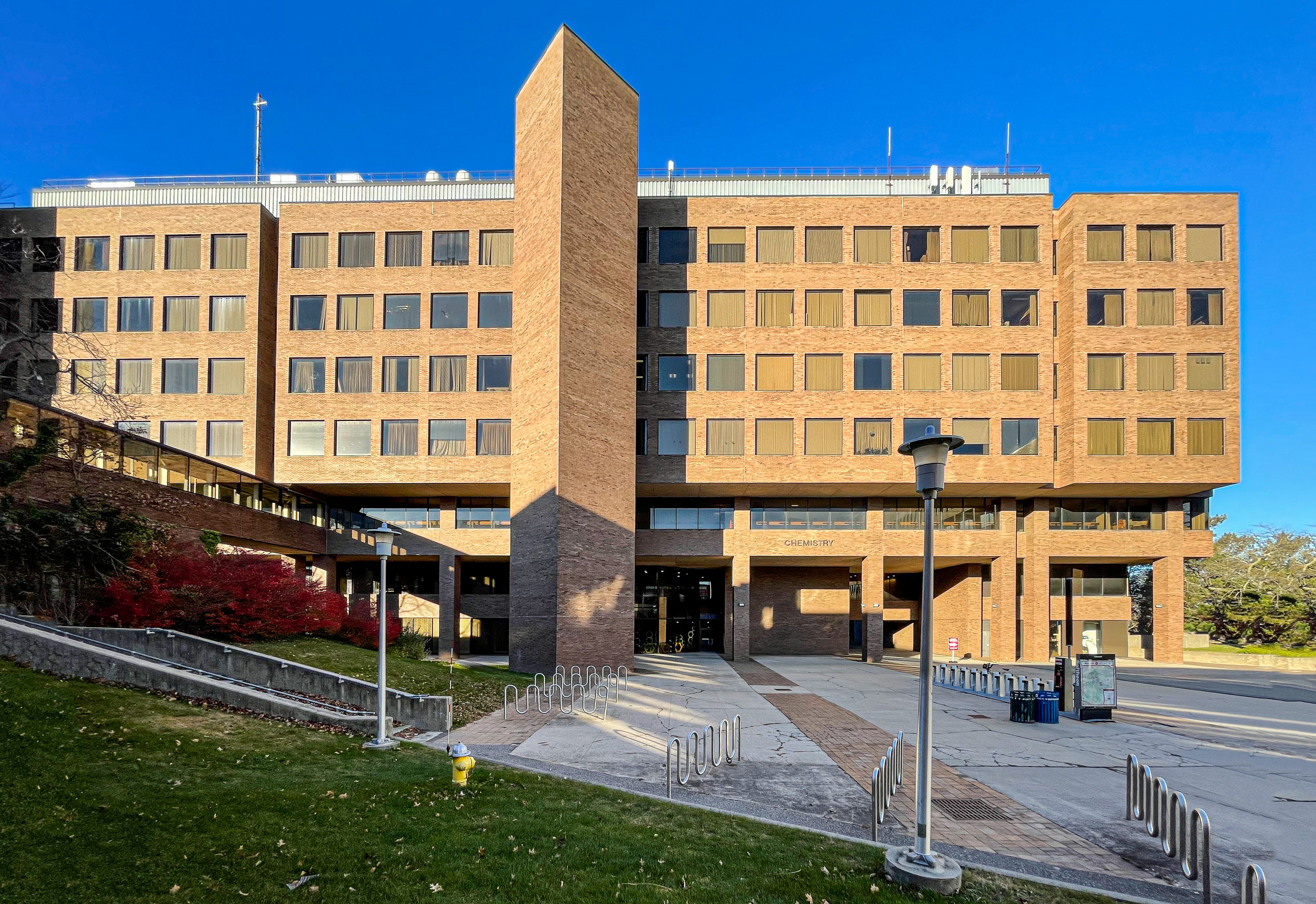
Chemistry

The Life Sciences Building contains classrooms, labs, and academic departments of Biochemistry and Cell Biology.

=== Chemistry Building ===
The Chemistry Building is the home of the Chemistry Department as well as the site of the Chemistry Library. It is located at the base of the zebra path, next to the Melville Library. The building opened in 1962 as the Chemistry Laboratory, one of two buildings (along with the Humanities Building) to be completed when Stony Brook University moved its campus to Stony Brook from Oyster Bay. It was renamed to the Chemistry Building in 1983 to reflect its current usage. It is seven stories tall and 170,000 square feet, designed for research and upper-division instructional activities.

=== Math Tower ===
Mathematics Tower and Umbilic Torus

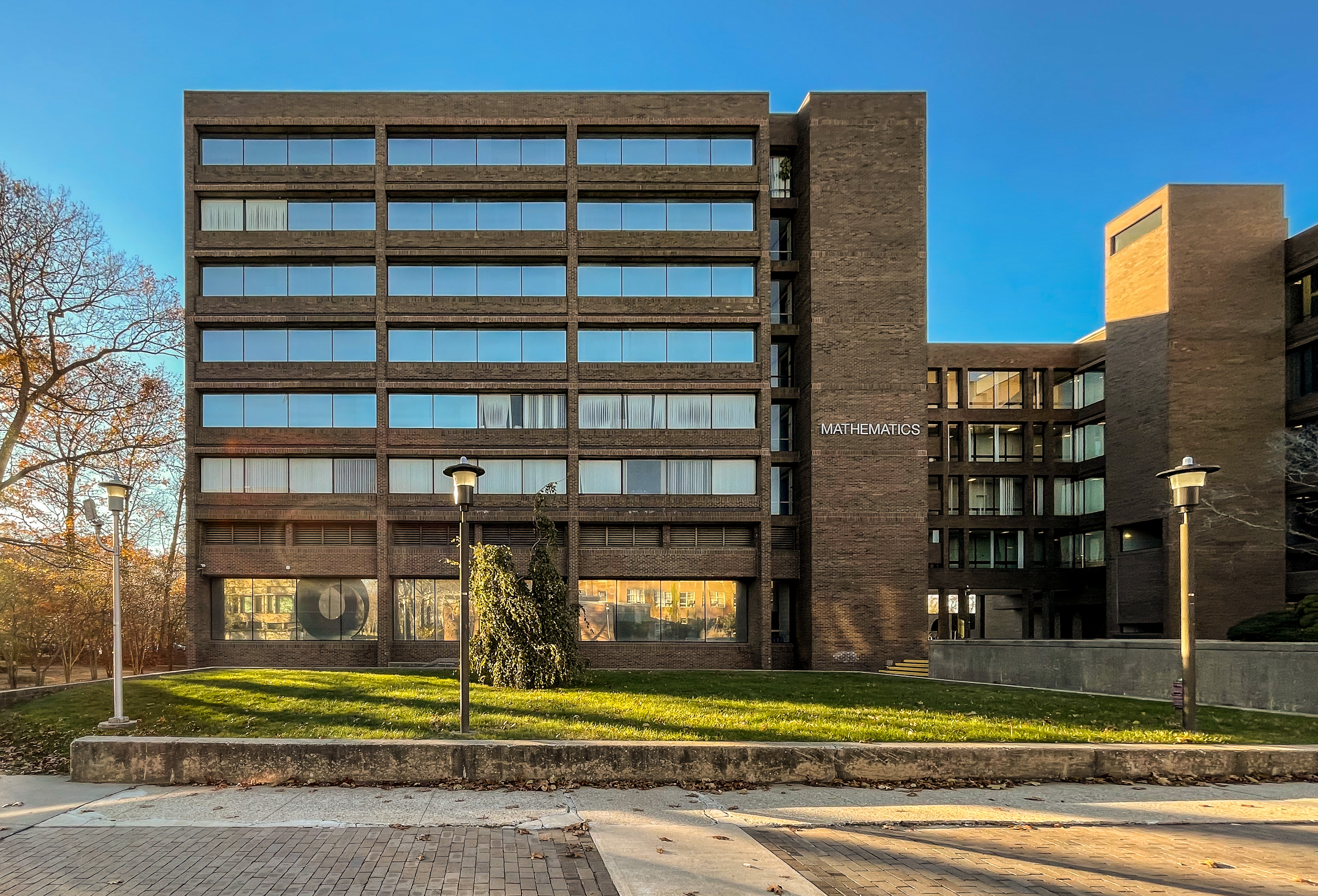
Math Tower

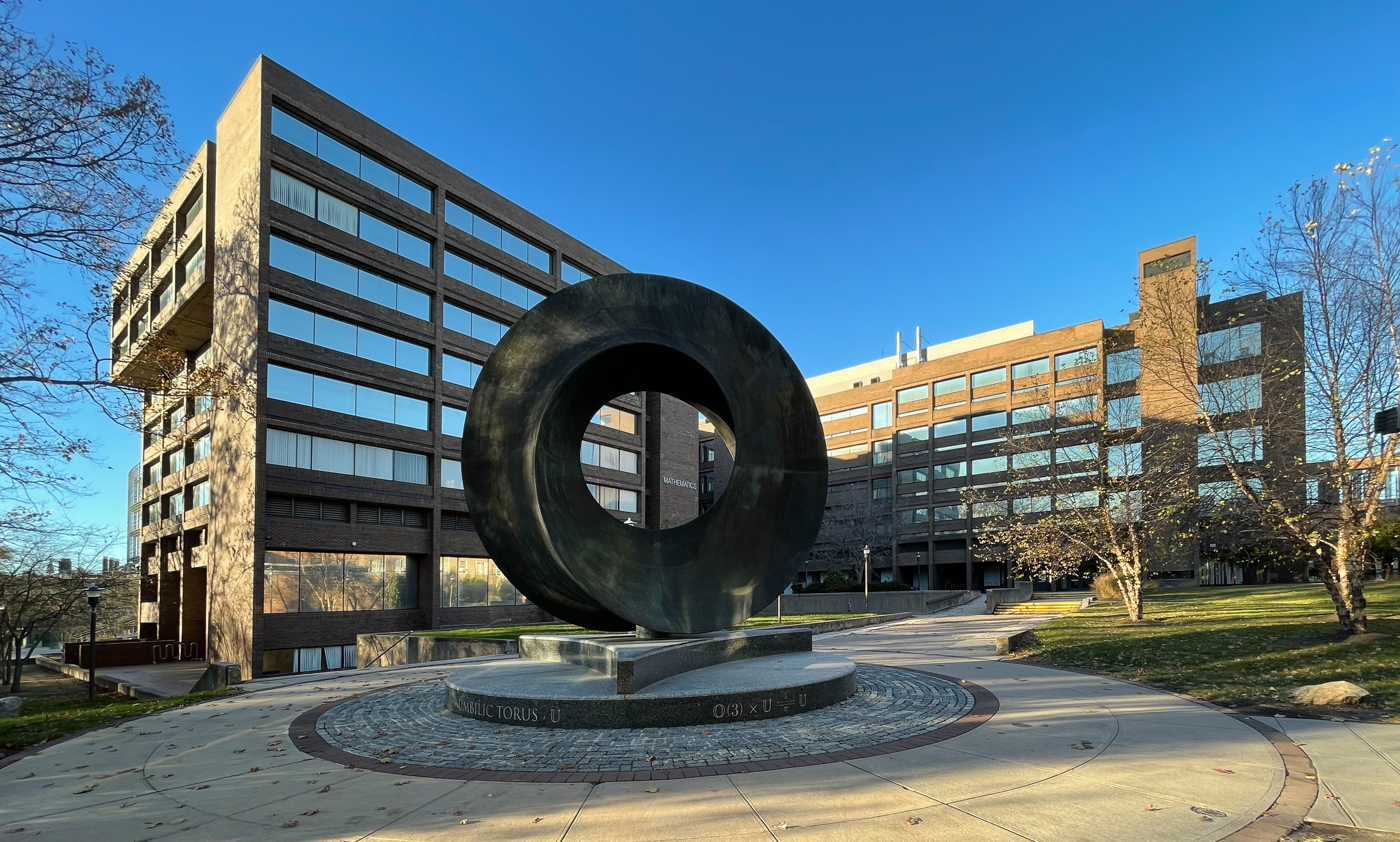
Umbilic Torus in front of Math Tower and Physics building

The Math Tower opened in 1973 and is currently the location of the Mathematics and Applied Mathematics & Statistics departments. The five-story building is connected to both the Physics Building and the Simons Center for Geometry and Physics. In 2012, a 24-foot bronze sculpture, the Umbilic Torus, was erected outside of the Math Tower. Designed by sculpture Helaman Ferguson and commissioned by Jim Simons, the Umbilic Torus is a mathematically inspired three-dimensional ring with only one edge that wraps around three times. It is a nearly ten-ton structure that took two years to complete. According to former Stony Brook University president Samuel L. Stanley, "the Umbilic Torus provides an elegant gateway to the nearby Simons Center for Geometry and Physics on one side, and from the other direction frames an entrance to the academic mall."

=== Physics Building ===
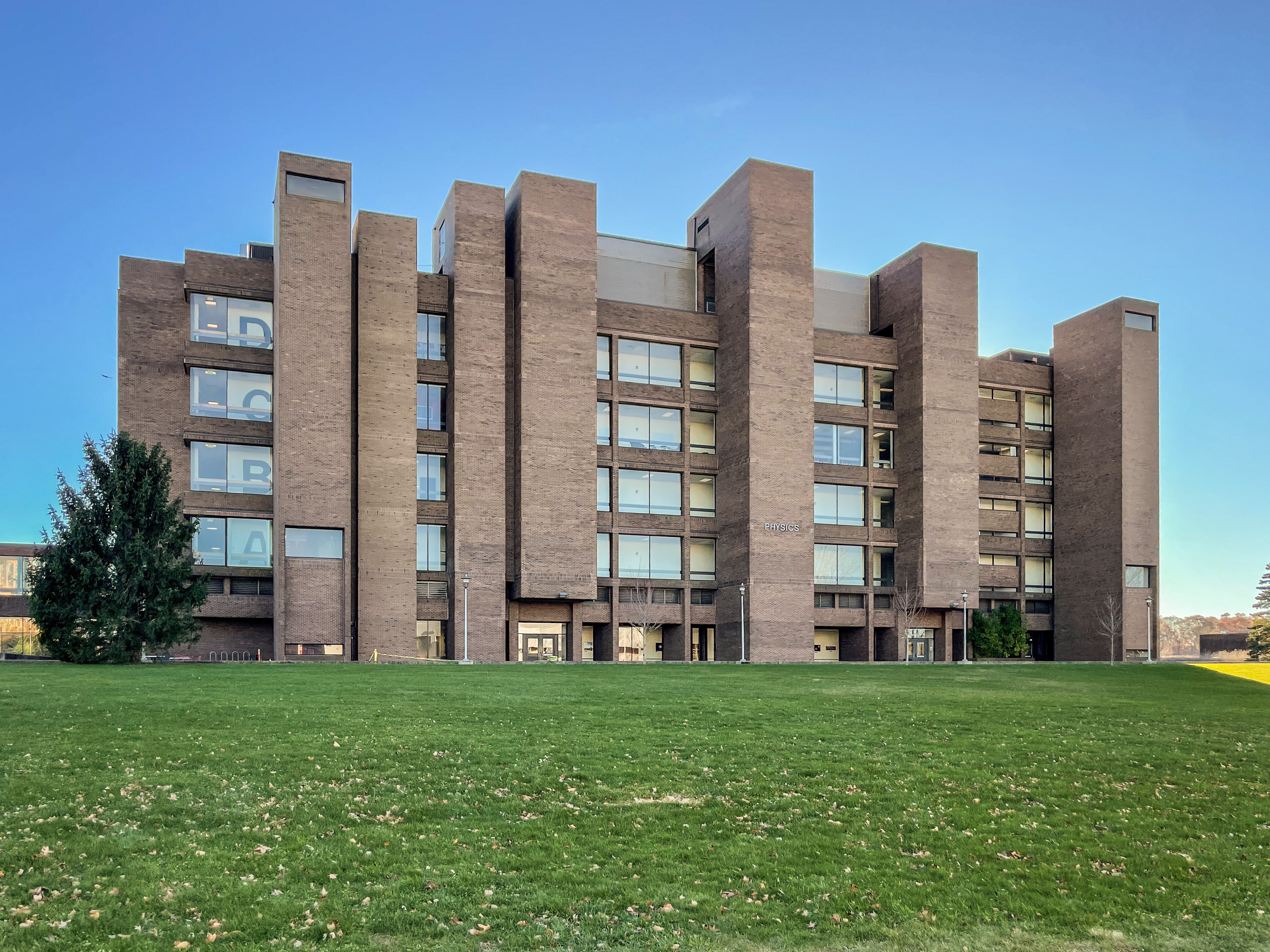
Physics Building

The Physics Building houses the Department of Physics and Astronomy. The building opened in 1963 as the Physical Laboratory, housing both physics and mathematics departments, before being renamed to the Physics Building in 1983 to reflect its current usage. Hallways connect the building to both Harriman Hall and the Math Tower. The building contains the Math, Physics and Astronomy Library in its basement level.

=== Humanities Building ===
The Humanities Building is the home of the Cultural Studies and Comparative Literature; English; European Languages, Literatures, and Cultures; and Hispanic Languages and Literature departments as well as of the Humanities Institute. It opened in 1962 along with the Chemistry Building as the first two buildings on the campus when it recently moved to Stony Brook from Oyster Bay. Most classes were originally held in the Humanities Building during the campus' infancy. The Writing Center is located on the building's second floor. The building underwent renovations in 2002. The main lobby of the Humanities Building is located under a skylight. The building also contains an atrium with a greenhouse ceiling that is often used as a study space.

=== Engineering Quad ===
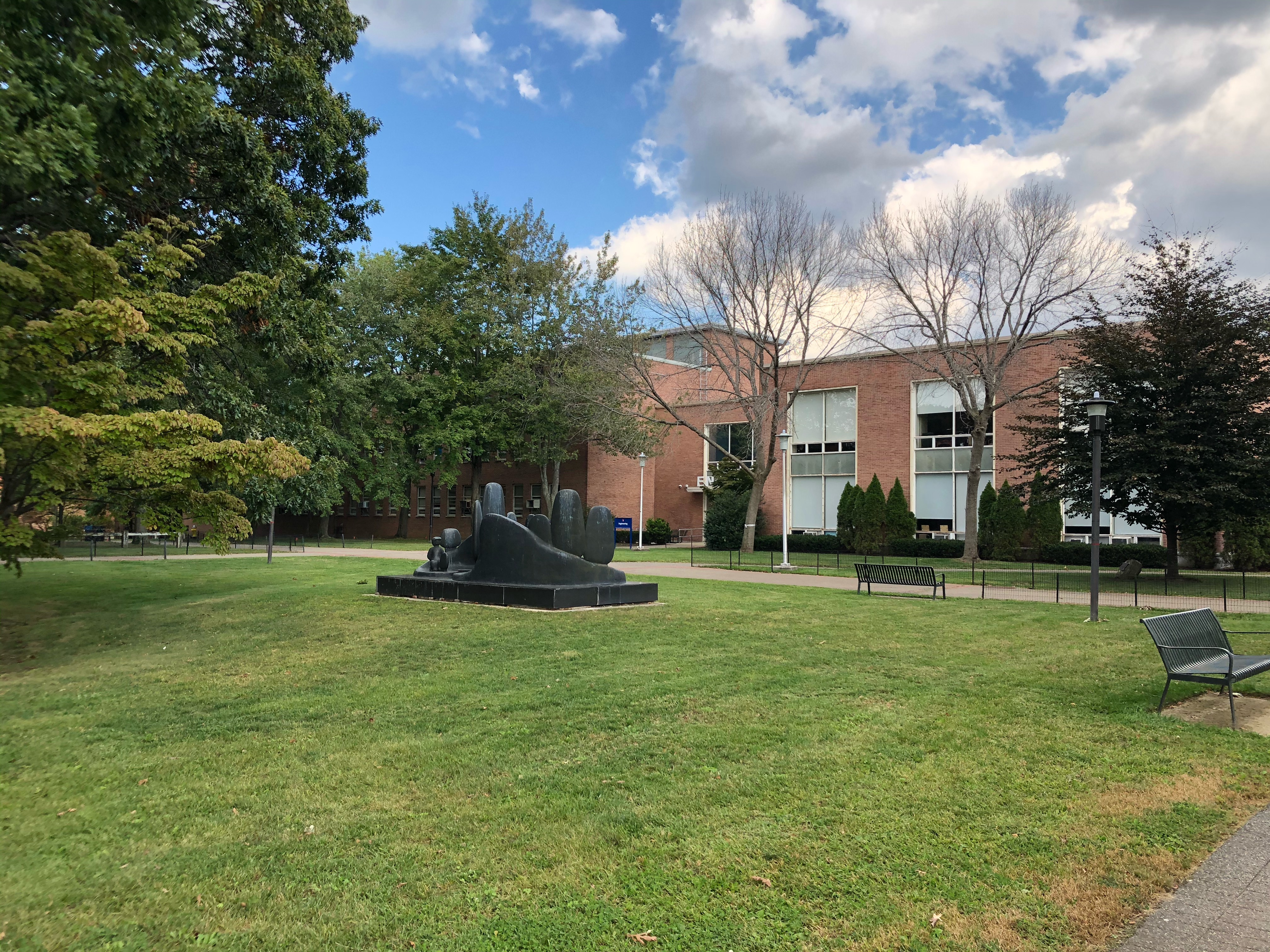
Engineering Quad

The Engineering Quad is the site of Stony Brook's engineering laboratories, classrooms and lecture halls. In 1993, a Korean sculpture was dedicated at the center of the quad. The buildings on the perimeter of the Engineering Quad are Engineering, Light Engineering, Heavy Engineering and the Computing Center. The original Heavy Engineering building was built in the late 1960s but underwent a renovation in 2006 that added 45,000 square feet to the already 68,000-square-foot structure. The expansion added labs, administration offices, student lounges and a glass atrium.

=== New Computer Science ===
The New Computer Science building contains laboratories, faculty offices and conference areas. The 70,000-square foot building opened in 2015 and cost $40.8 million. 27,000 square feet of the building is dedicated to research lab space, which are specialized for Digital Media, Light Dome, Sound Booth, Virtual Reality, and Wireless Sensor, among others. There is a 4,000-square foot glass atrium that features an "open, light-filled design." The building's brick and cedar cladding is said to be in harmony with Stony Brook's "woodland setting", and the atrium spans three floors with common spaces, walkways and bridges.

== Athletic facilities ==
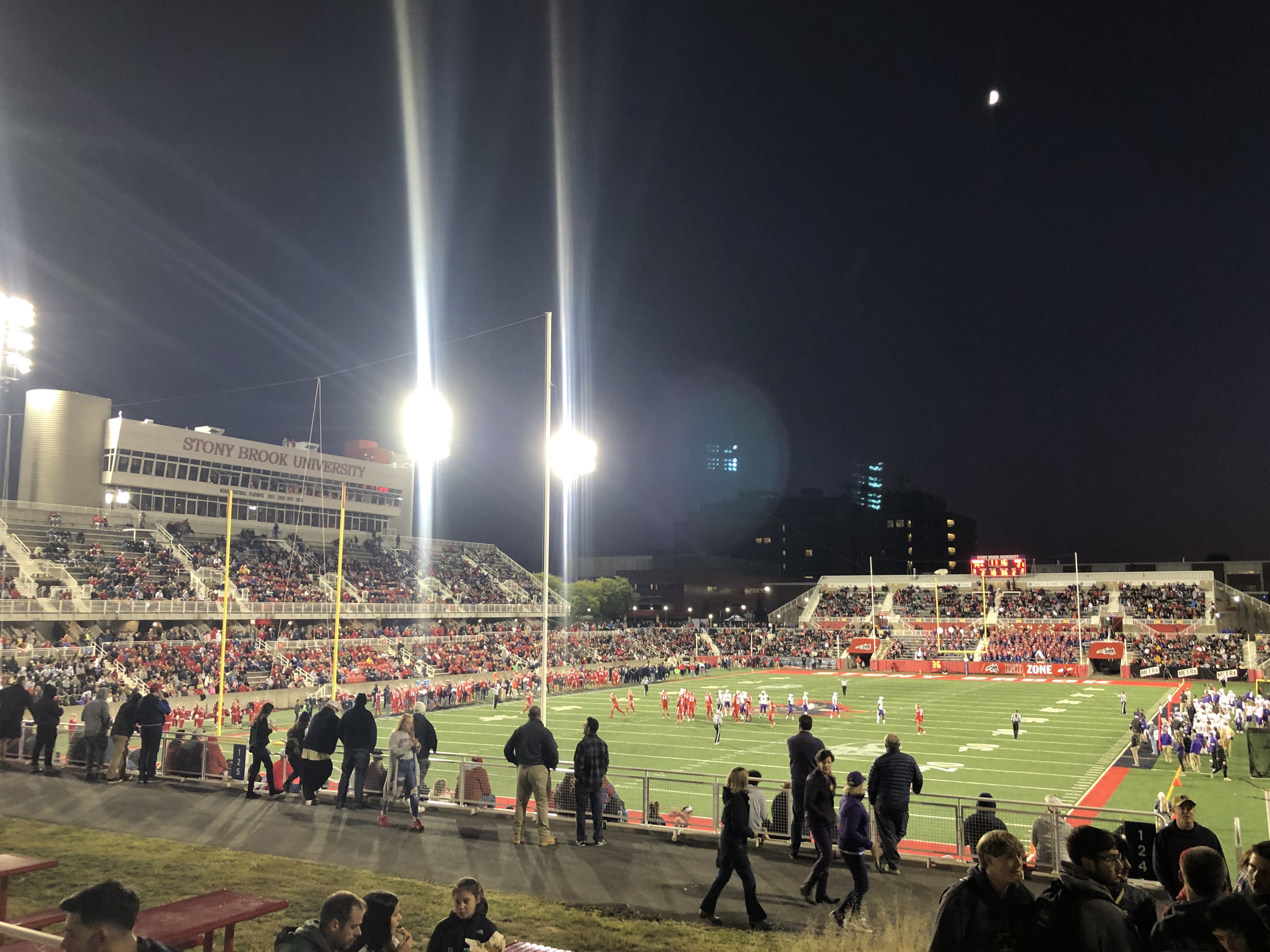
Kenneth P. LaValle Stadium

=== Kenneth P. LaValle Stadium ===
The Kenneth P. LaValle Stadium is the main athletic stadium for Stony Brook's Division I athletic teams, the Seawolves. With a seating capacity of 12,300, it is the largest outdoor facility in Suffolk County. It hosts home games for Stony Brook's football, men's and women's soccer and men's and women's lacrosse teams. It was constructed in 2002 at a cost of $22 million and named after senator Kenneth LaValle, who secured the funding for the stadium. Its most recent expansion came in 2017, when 2,000 seats were added to the north end zone along with a new concessions and restroom facility. A new turf field was installed in 2018. LaValle Stadium has also hosted official NCAA championship games, such as the Final Four of the NCAA Division I Women's Lacrosse Championship in 2012 and 2018.

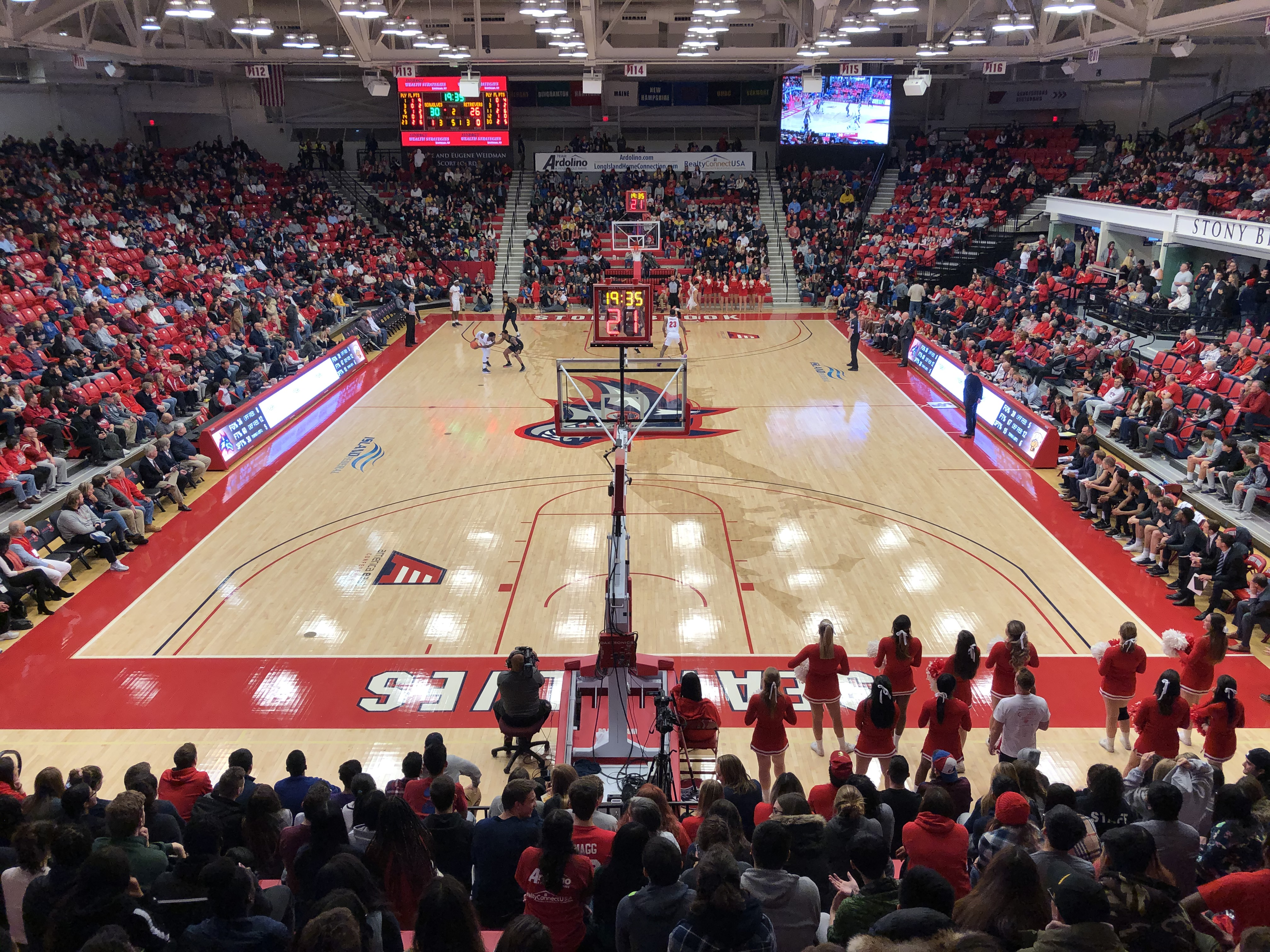
Island Federal Credit Union Arena

=== Island Federal Credit Union Arena ===
The Island Federal Credit Union Arena is a multi-purpose indoor arena that hosts Stony Brook's home games for its men's and women's basketball teams. It has a seating capacity of 4,160. It originally opened in 1990 as the Stony Brook University Arena for $17 million, located at the west wing of the Stony Brook Indoor Sports Complex. The arena underwent a $21.1 million renovation from 2012 to 2014, reopening in 2014 and securing a $7 million corporate sponsorship deal with a regional credit union. The arena contains four luxury suites, a VIP lounge area and premium courtside seating. The renovation added four scoreboards and two video boards. Island Federal Credit Union Arena has also hosted concerts, trade shows, conventions and graduations. It hosted the 2019 NBA G League Finals due to conflicts with the Long Island Nets' home arena. The court was renovated in 2019 to add the Seawolves' logo and a silhouette of Long Island.

=== Joe Nathan Field ===
Joe Nathan Field

Joe Nathan Field is an outdoor baseball field located at the northern end of Stony Brook's West Campus. It hosts the home games for the Stony Brook's baseball team. It opened in 2011 and is named after Stony Brook alumnus Joe Nathan, a six-time MLB All-Star and Minnesota Twins Hall of Famer who donated $500,000 for extensive renovations of the old facility. The facility cost $1.3 million to construct. The field has a seating capacity of 1,000 and its dimensions are 330 feet to left and right field, and 395 feet to center field. The new Joe Nathan Field contains FieldTurf unlike the old grass surface. It hosted the 2011 and 2012 America East Conference baseball tournament, which Stony Brook won in 2012 to set up their Cinderella run to the 2012 College World Series. Nick Tropeano was the first player to pitch at Joe Nathan Field. Plans for a renovation that will include a new scoreboard, stadium seating, lights and a press box is currently in the planning stages, but needs financial support.

=== Pritchard Gymnasium ===
Pritchard Gymnasium

The Pritchard Gymnasium is an indoor multi-purpose gymnasium that is currently the site of home games for Stony Brook's volleyball team. It opened in 1967 and currently seats 1,700 with 20,000 square feet of space. From 1967 to 1990, it was the home venue for Stony Brook's men's and women's basketball teams until the opening of the Stony Brook University Arena. During the renovation of the arena, Stony Brook played its home games at Pritchard Gymnasium again from 2008 to 2014. Pritchard Gymnasium was known for giving Stony Brook a large home-field advantage, with its men's basketball team going 37–3 at home in Pritchard from 2011 to 2014. It underwent a $1.5 million renovation in 2008 to upgrade the seating, add a new scoreboard and refinish the hardwood floor. Pritchard Gymnasium was the site of many historical concerts at Stony Brook University, with musicians and bands such as Jimi Hendrix, The Clash, Siouxsie and the Banshees, Ramones, Red Hot Chili Peppers and The Notorious B.I.G. playing shows in the venue.

=== Stony Brook Indoor Sports Complex ===
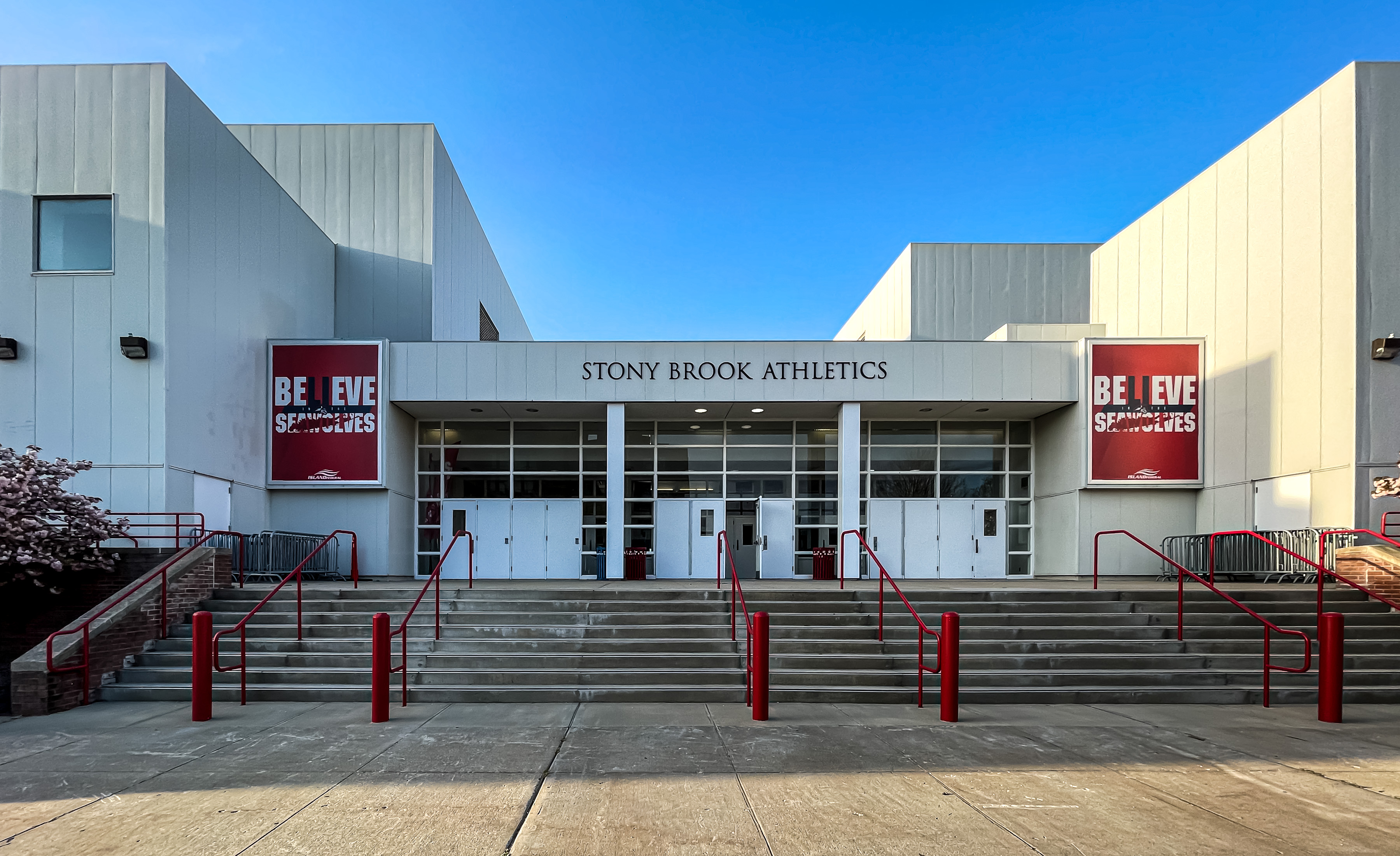
Stony Brook Indoor Sports Complex

The Stony Brook Indoor Sports Complex is a multi-purpose complex that serves as the center of Stony Brook's athletic program. It contains multiple venues – Island Federal Credit Union Arena in its west wing and Pritchard Gymnasium in its east wing – as well as the University Pool, the Dubin Family Athletic Performance Center and the Goldstein Family Student-Athlete Development Center.

The University Pool re-opened in 2017 following years of renovations that began in 2015, and it is the home venue for Stony Brook's swimming and diving team. The pool is also available to use for students. The Dubin Family Athletic Performance Center is an 8,000-square foot strength and conditioning facility that opened in 2012 following a $4.3 million donation from the family of Stony Brook alumnus Glenn Dubin, who made the largest private athletic donation to a school in the State University of New York system. The Goldstein Family Student-Athlete Development Center is a 6,000-square foot academic center that opened in 2006 after a donation from alumnus Stuart Goldstein. It has a computer lab, a study hall, a career resource/library area and several private tutor rooms for student-athletes, as well as administrative offices for the academic advising staff.

=== Walter J. Hawrys Campus Recreation Center ===
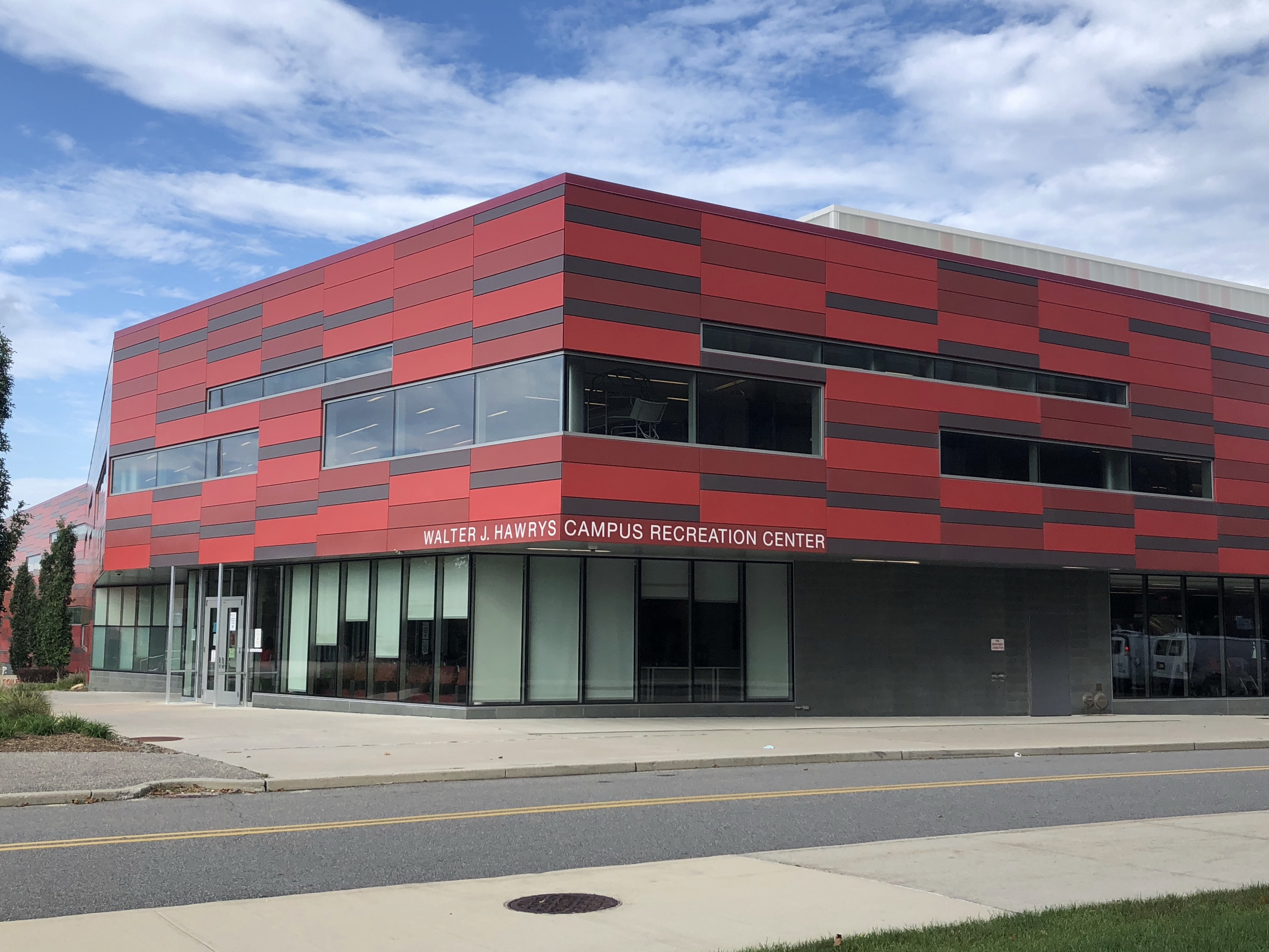
Walter J. Hawrys Campus Recreation Center

The Walter J. Hawrys Campus Recreation Center is a student gymnasium and recreation center. Located on John S. Toll Drive, the $37.5 million, 85,000-square foot building opened in 2012 after three years of construction. It was dedicated to Walter J. Hawrys in 2014, whose South Shore Brick Masons company built numerous buildings on the Stony Brook campus. The recreation center averages 2,000 visitors per day. Its design was praised for its "cohesive theme of horizontally and vertically stacked red, gray, gray-black and black panels appearing in everything from day lockers to glazing."

== Student housing ==
Stony Brook University is the largest residential public school in the state of New York, with nearly 10,000 students choosing to live on campus. While the vast majority of housing is located on Stony Brook's West Campus, residential options are available at the East Campus and Stony Brook Southampton for undergraduate students, graduate students and their families. First-year students are divided into residential communities based on a system of "Undergraduate Colleges" that bring together students of similar interests. In the 1960s, the Stony Brook University administration decided to name its dormitory buildings after the theme of "Great Deceased New Yorkers."

=== Mendelsohn Community ===
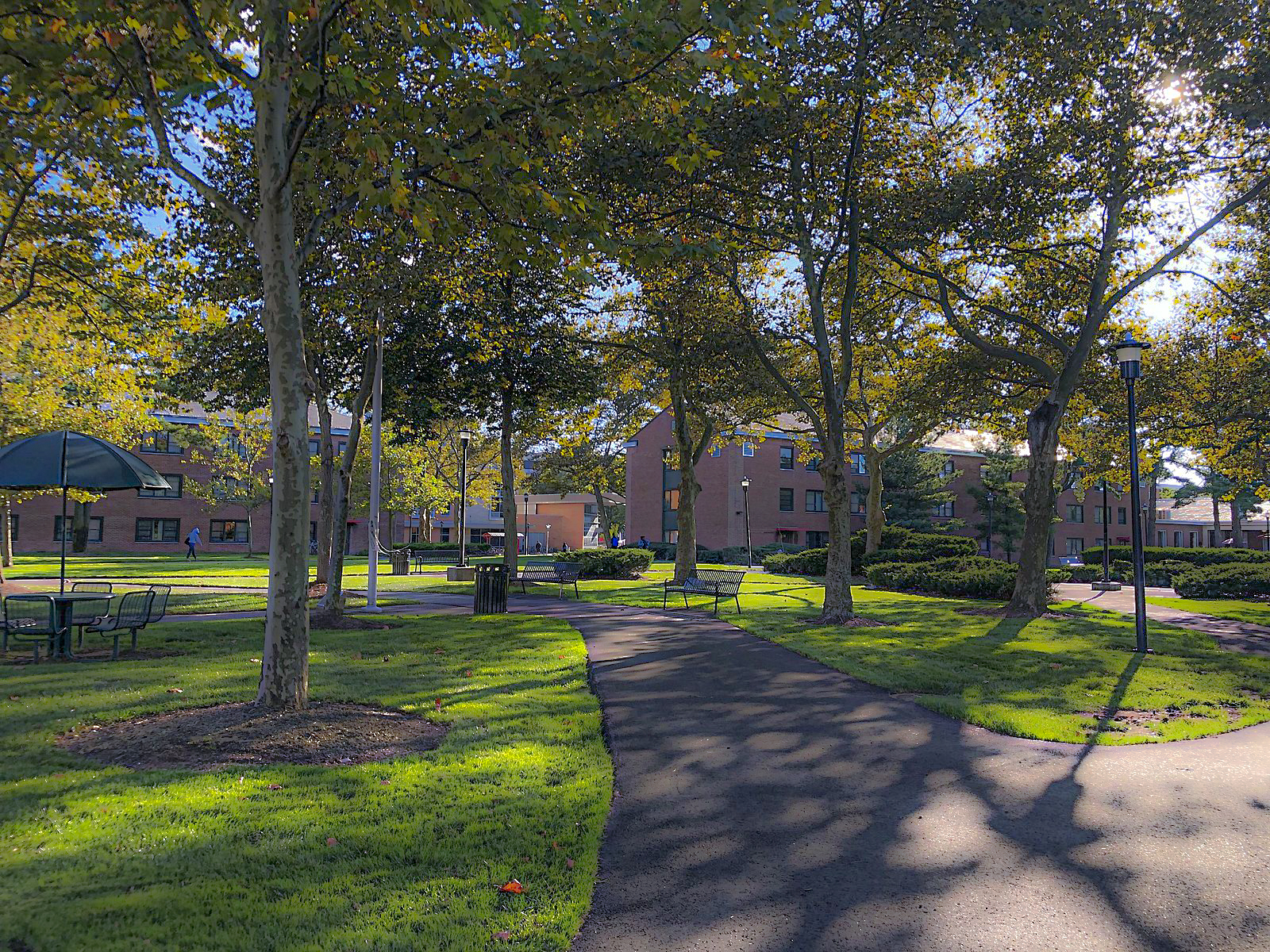
Mendelsohn Community

Mendelsohn Community is one of the two original quads of campus housing that were first built in 1961, along with H Quad. It was originally named G Quad due to its designation on an architectural plan but was renamed in honor of Harold Mendelsohn in 1993. Mendelsohn was a former G Quad director who had died in 1992 at the age of 40 after a heart attack. The campus was originally built around Mendelsohn Quad, which is located in the north end of campus next to Stadium Drive. Mendelsohn Quad contains four dormitory buildings: Irving Hall, O'Neill Hall, Gray Hall and Ammann Hall. Irving and O'Neill Halls were originally one building, G Building, before being renamed after Washington Irving and Eugene O'Neill in 1967. In 1968, Ammann Hall, formerly North Hall, was dedicated to Othmar Ammann. Gray Hall, formerly South Hall, was named for Asa Gray.

All of Mendelsohn Community's buildings are corridor style. Students in the Women in Science and Engineering (WISE) program are required to live in O'Neill Hall. The Undergraduate College associated with Mendelsohn Community is Information and Technology Studies (ITS). The Center for Information and Technology Studies, located in Gray Hall, was completed in 2008 and is the location of seminar classes, a craft room and a lounge.

=== H Community ===
H Community, along with Mendelsohn Community, was one of the first two quads of campus housing on the Stony Brook campus. It is the northernmost quad on campus. The name, originally taken from Benedict Hall's former designation as building H on an architectural plan, was planned as a placeholder for a permanent name, but has yet to be changed. H Community contains three dormitory buildings: Benedict Hall, James Hall and Langmuir Hall. During the naming of the residential Halls in 1967, the H Quad residence unit was named Benedict Hall after Ruth Benedict, J South was named James Hall after Henry James and J North was named Langmuir Hall after Irving Langmuir. Benedict Hall was formerly the home of the Benedict Saloon, an on-campus bar that operated from 1969 to 1980, when new university president John Marburger ordered the phasing-out of campus bars.

All of H Community's buildings are corridor style. The Undergraduate College associated with H Community is Leadership and Service (LDS). The Dallas W. Bauman Center for Leadership and Service, formerly known as the LDS Center, is located in Benedict College and contains a large multi-purpose room with a capacity of 600.

=== Roth Quad ===
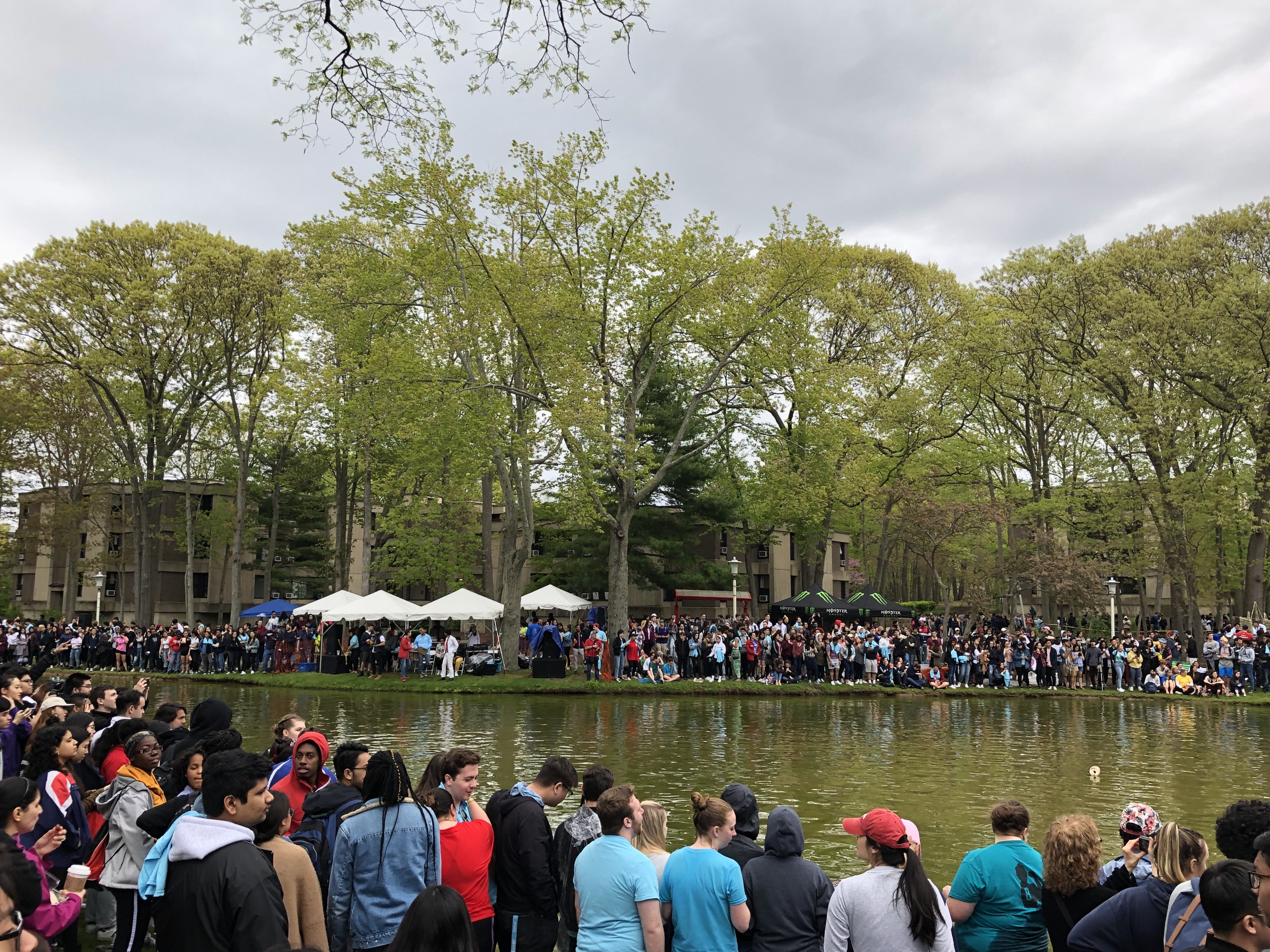
Roth Community

Roth Quad was finished in 1967 after construction which began in 1965; it is named after Emery Roth & Sons, the architects who designed the area. It consists of five buildings: Cardozo Hall, Whitman Hall, Gershwin Hall, Hendrix Hall and Mount Hall. The dormitories, formerly designated Roth I through Roth V, are named after Benjamin N. Cardozo, Walt Whitman, George Gershwin, Jimi Hendrix and William Sidney Mount. Hendrix Hall was originally named Henry College after Joseph Henry in 1967, but was informally rechristened after Hendrix's death in 1970 without the name change being made official in state legislation. The dormitories are located around Roth Pond, the site of the annual Roth Pond Regatta, one of Stony Brook University's most popular and long-running traditions. Roth quad contains the Roth Cafe, a multi-level dining facility with retail options.

All of Roth Community's buildings are in suite style. The Undergraduate College associated with Roth Community is Science and Society (SSO). The Center for Science and Society, located on the lower level of the Roth Cafe, opened in 2008.

=== Tabler Community ===
Tabler Community opened in the fall of 1969, named after an architect Tabler, who planned and built the region. It consists of five buildings: Hand Hall, Douglass Hall, Dreiser Hall, Sanger Hall and Toscanini Hall. The dormitories were named after Learned Hand, Frederick Douglass, Theodore Dreiser, Margaret Sanger and Arturo Toscanini. In recent years, the naming of Sanger Hall has been contested due to Sanger's support of eugenics. On April 5, 2023, Sanger Hall was officially renamed Dr. May Edward Chinn Hall. Tabler Community is located on the top of a hill overlooking Circle Road, adjacent to Roth Community.

All of Tabler Community's buildings are in suite style. The Undergraduate College associated with Tabler Community is Arts, Cultures and Humanities (ACH). The Tabler Center for Arts, Culture, and Humanities opened in 2004 and contains a 250-seat theater for theater, dance, and music, practice rooms for musicians, an art gallery devoted to works from undergraduate students, a digital arts laboratory, conference halls and classrooms.

=== Kelly Community ===
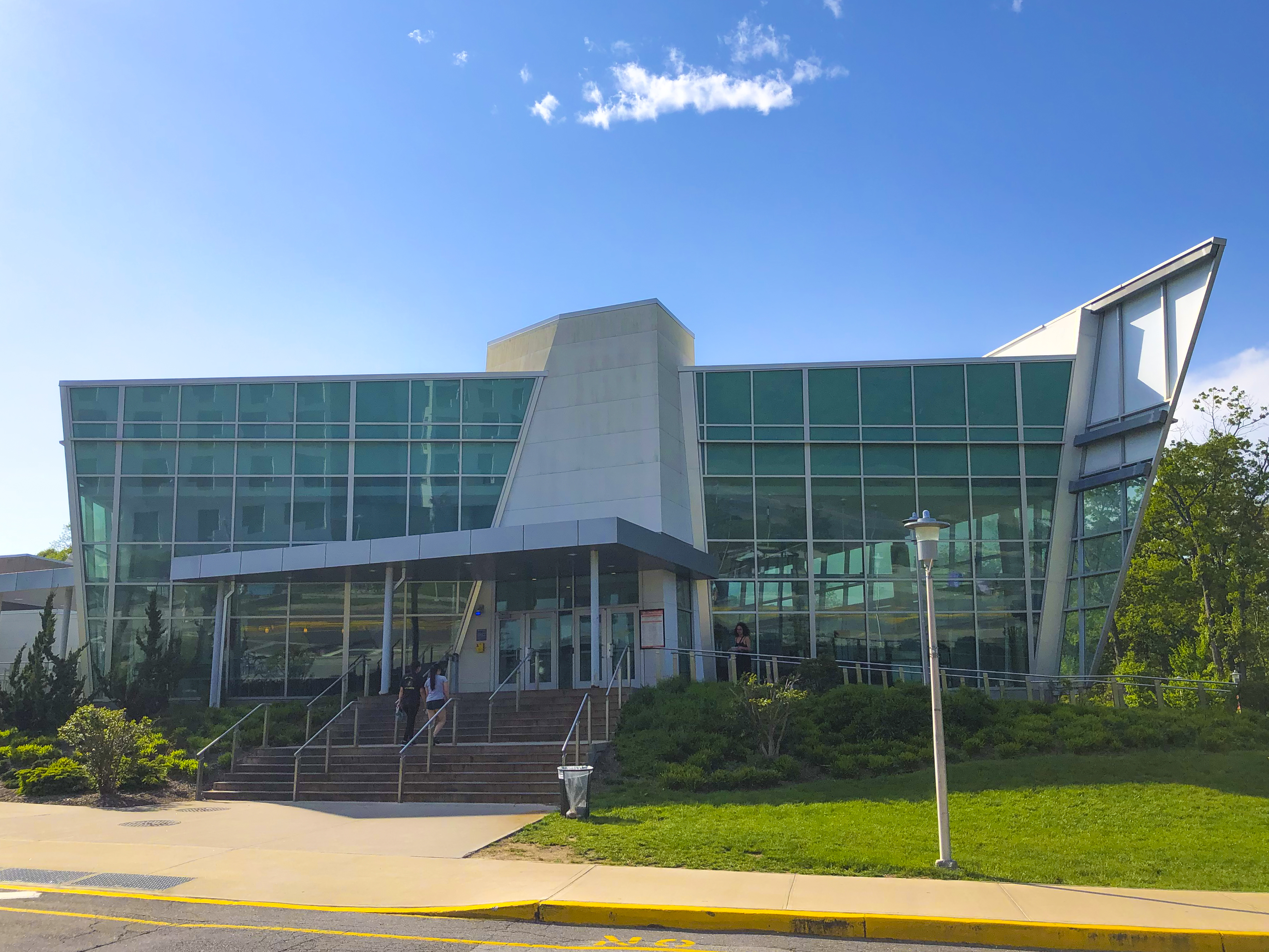
West Side Dining

Kelly Community opened in 1969, becoming the fifth community on Stony Brook's campus. It is named after Hugh A. Kelly, one-half of the Kelly and Gruzen architectural firm that built the quad. Kelly Community was the result of a $7.5 million allotment from then-New York governor Nelson Rockefeller in 1967 for a residential college complex to be completed within the next two years, hiring Kelly and Gruzen for the project. It is located on Circle Road, at the west end of the West Campus. The original Kelly Community consists of five buildings: Dewey Hall, Baruch Hall, Eisenhower Hall, Schick Hall and Hamilton Hall. The dormitories were named after John Dewey, Bernard Baruch, Dwight D. Eisenhower, Béla Schick and Alexander Hamilton. The names of Kelly Community's buildings were originally given to Stony Brook students to decide, who named them after Harpo Marx, Edgar Allan Poe, Lenny Bruce, Woody Guthrie and John Steinbeck, respectively. However, these names were not approved by the Stony Brook Council or higher administration in Albany.

All of Kelly Community's buildings are in suite style. The Undergraduate College associated with Kelly Community is Human Development (HDV). Kelly Community is the site of the newly reopened West Side Dining facility, which originally opened in 1979 as the Kelly Dining Center before undergoing a $23 million renovation and re-opening in 2014 as a 45,000-square foot facility, the largest dining hall on the Stony Brook campus which serves over 30,000 customers per week. The new structure contains "gleaming glass" that offers natural light.

=== Eleanor Roosevelt Community ===
Eleanor Roosevelt Community

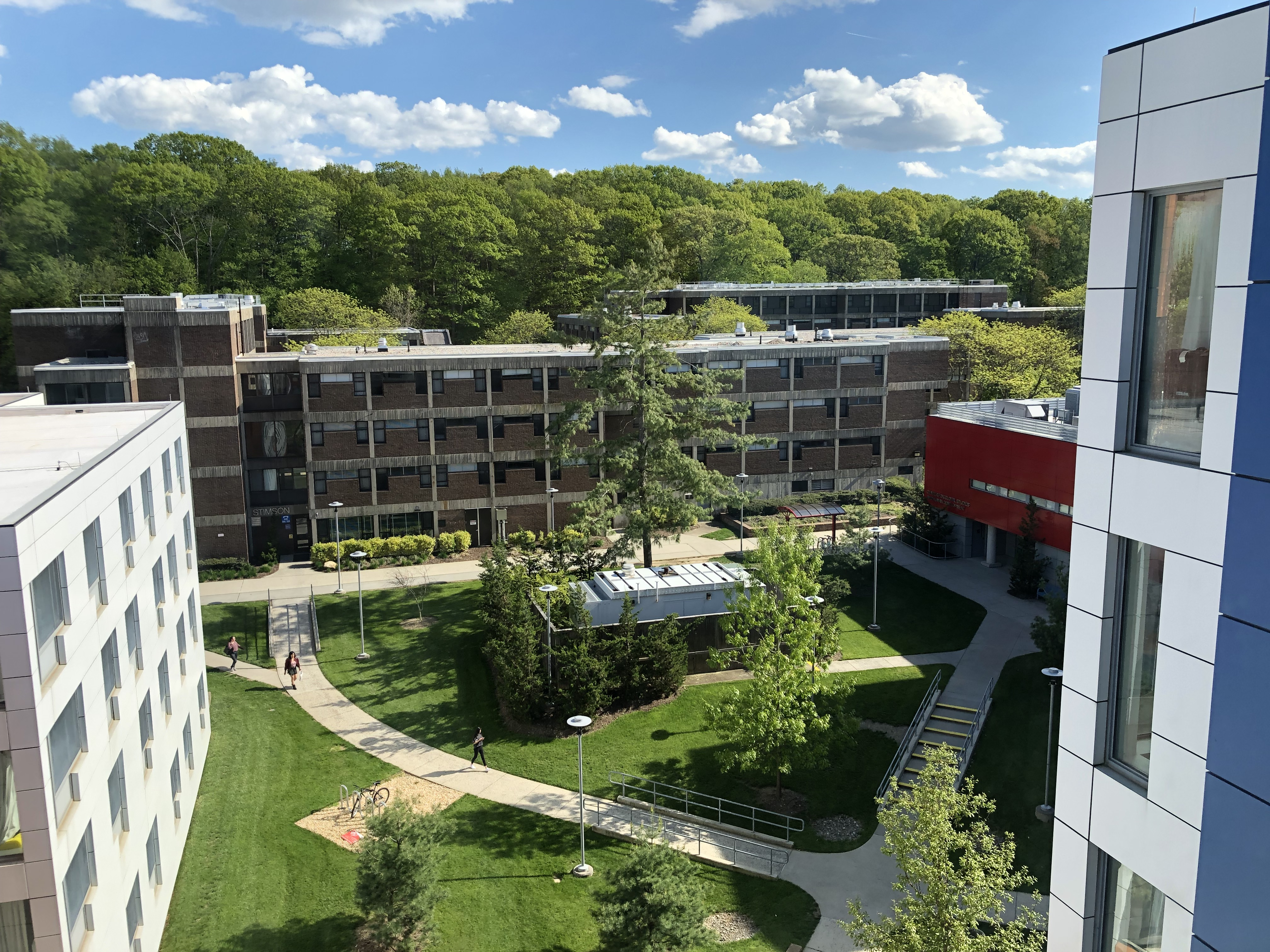
Eleanor Roosevelt Community

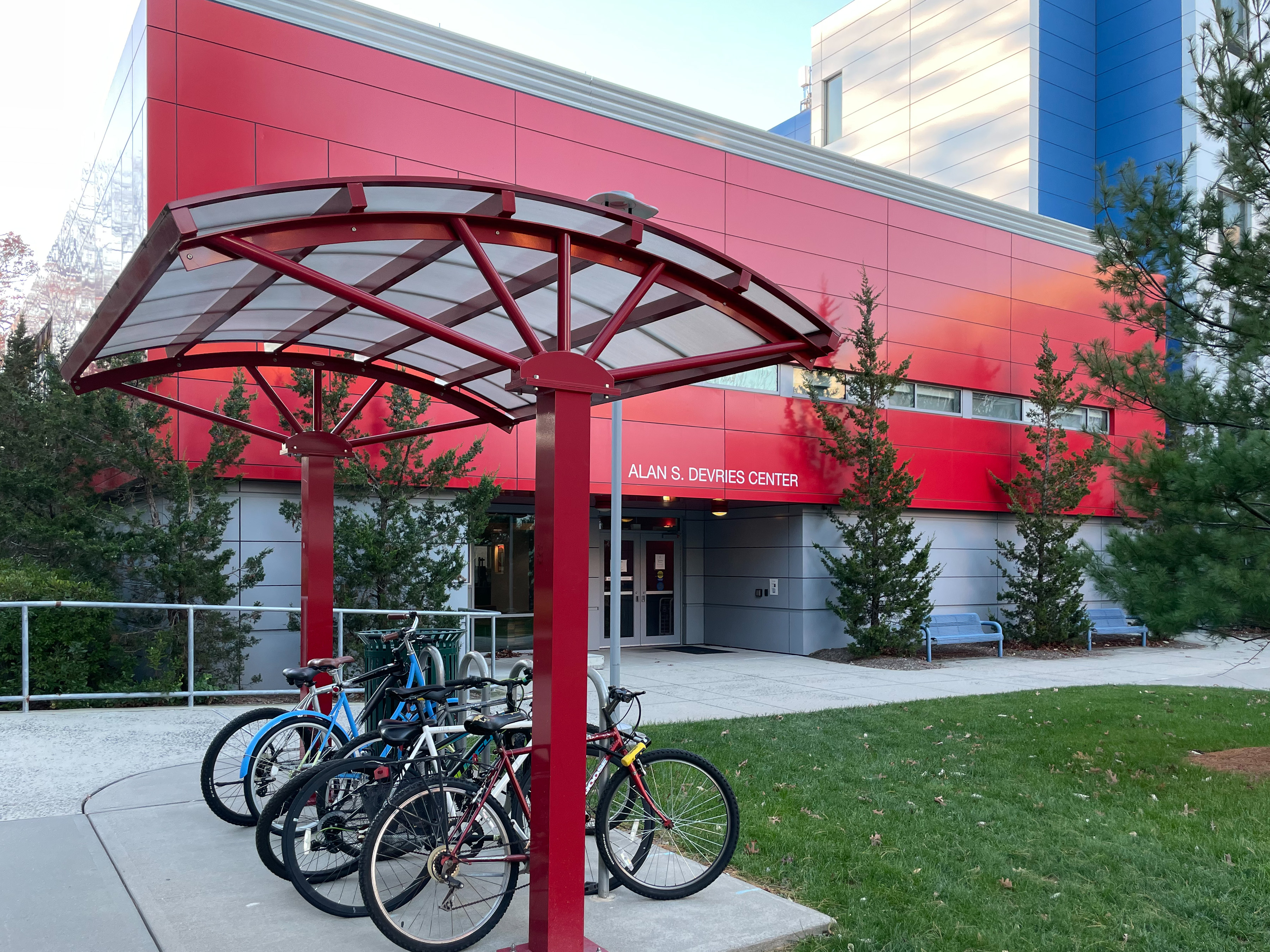
Alan S. Devries Center

Eleanor Roosevelt Community opened in 1970. Along with Kelly Community, it was the result of a $7.5 million allotment from then-New York governor Nelson Rockefeller in 1967 for a residential college complex to be completed within the next two years. It was nicknamed Gruzen Quad, after the other half of the Kelly and Gruzen architectural firm, before opening as Stage XII. Stage XII was renamed to Eleanor Roosevelt Quad in 1987 due to "the relationship of her United Nations work to the current development of an international studies minor in Keller Residential College." The original Roosevelt Community consists of four buildings: Stimson Hall, Keller Hall, Greeley Hall and Wagner Hall. The dormitories were named after Henry L. Stimson, Helen Keller, Horace Greeley and Robert Wagner.

The original Roosevelt Community buildings are all in corridor style. The Undergraduate College associated with Roosevelt Community is Global Studies (GLS). The Alan S. deVries Center, formerly known as the Center for Global Studies and Human Development (GLS-HDV Center), is located in Roosevelt Community, jointly serving the Undergraduate Colleges associated with Roosevelt Community and Kelly Community. It opened in 2010 and is connected to Lauterbur Hall. It provides multipurpose spaces and a café area.

=== West Apartments ===
The West Apartments are a series of 11 buildings totaling 230 apartments with both single and double bedrooms. The area opened in 2001 as the Undergraduate Apartments before being renamed to the West Apartments after a $41 million expansion in 2004 that brought the total number of beds in the area to 1,200 under eight apartment buildings. A ninth building, West I, opened in 2008. A tenth building, West J, opened in 2018. An eleventh building, West K, opened in 2020.

The headquarters of the West Apartments are located in West E, which contains the West E Commons.

=== Nobel Halls ===
Nobel Halls

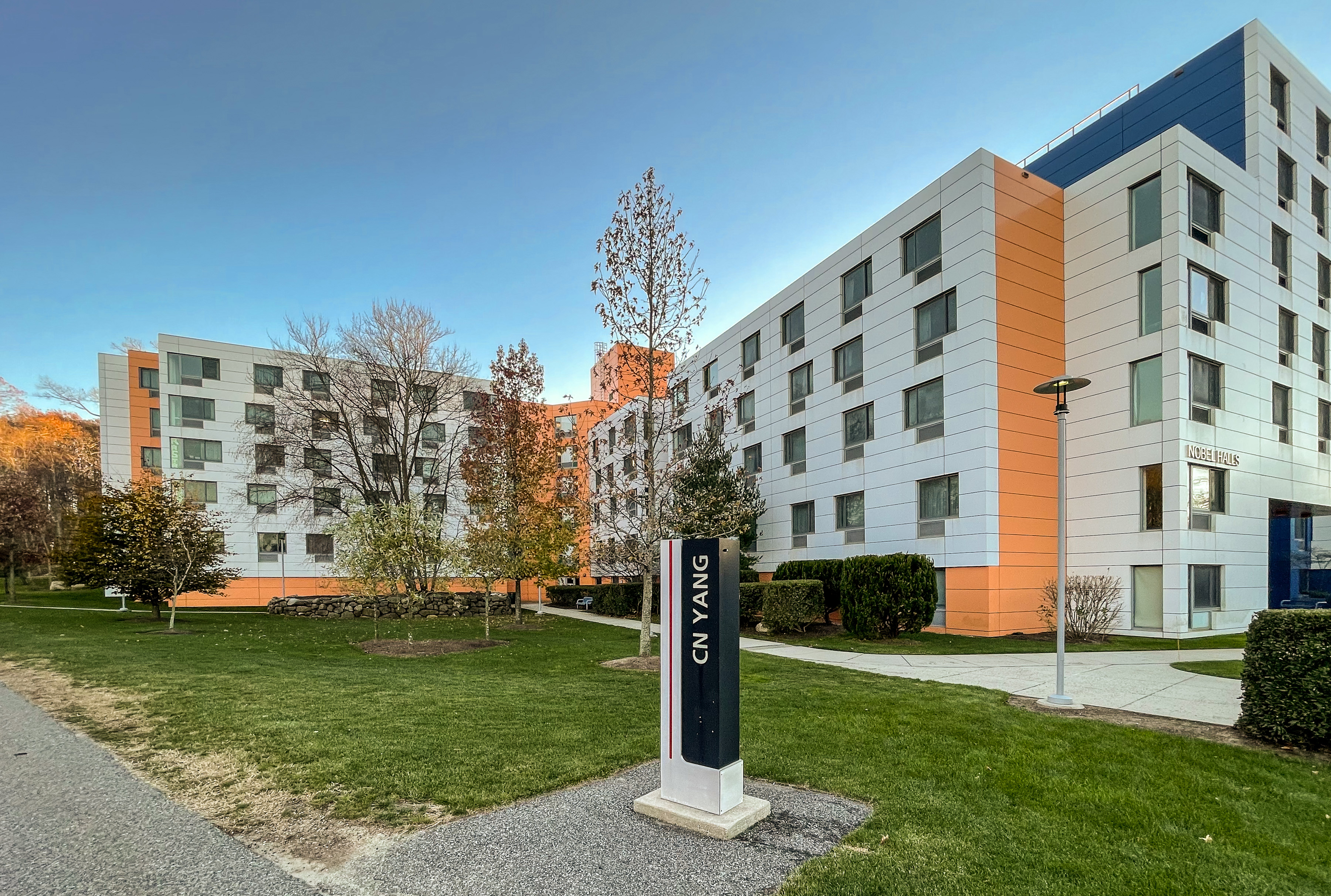
CN Yang Hall

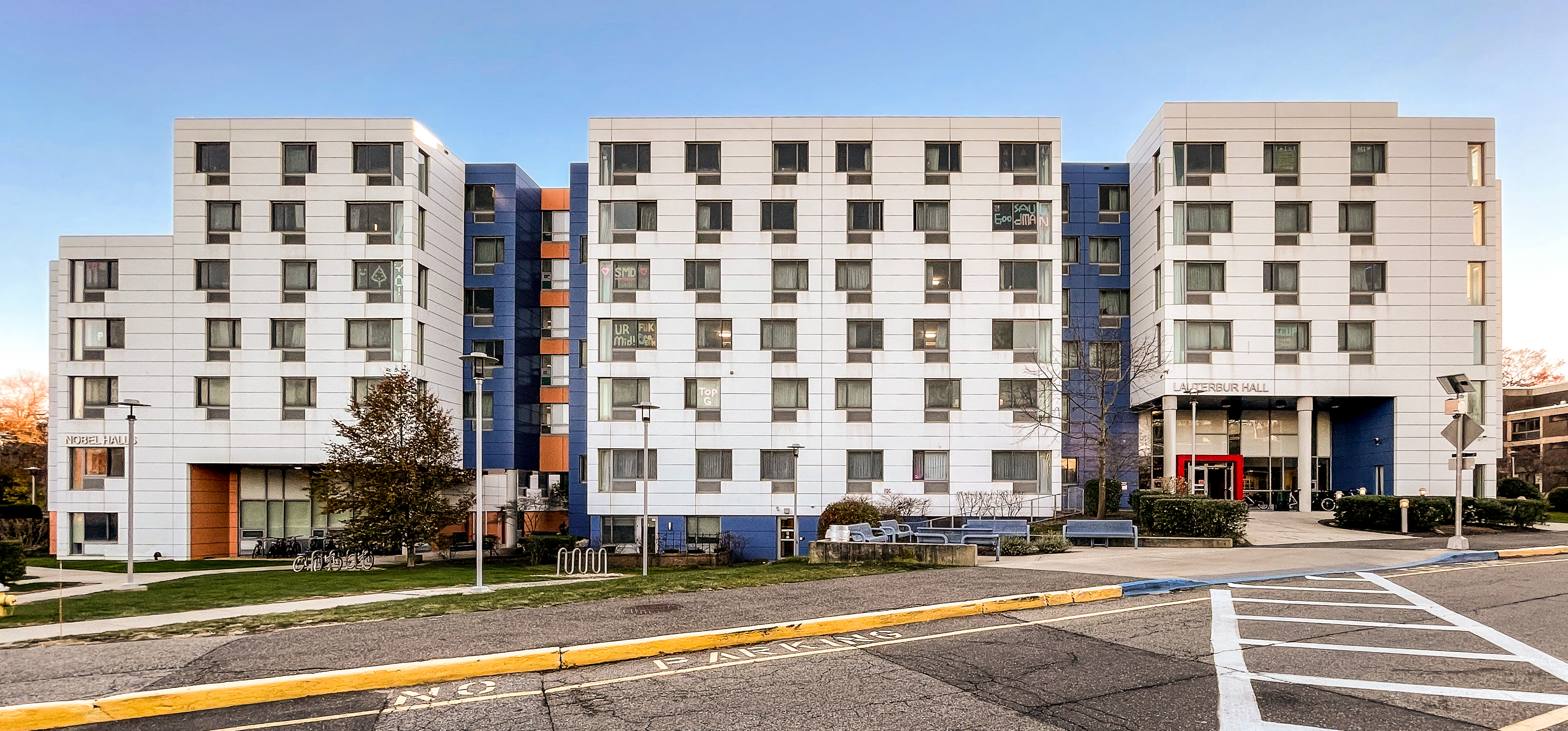
Lauterbur Hall

The Nobel Halls refers to a pair of residence halls that opened in 2010 and were named after Nobel Prize winners affiliated with Stony Brook University. The project cost $56 million and connects three buildings totaling 173,000 square feet. The halls provide 604 beds, split into 104 suite-style apartments featuring a living room, bathroom and three double bedrooms. Yang Hall, named after C.N. Yang, is part of Roosevelt Community, while Lauterbur Hall, named after Paul Lauterbur, is part of Kelly Community. The structures are made of bold-colored aluminum, which serve as the exterior cladding of the buildings. The aluminum colors chosen – birch, red, orange, white, blue and gray – were chosen to brighten the campus, as the architectural firm interviewed Stony Brook students prior to designing the buildings and aimed to fix a common criticism of the campus looking "too brown" during the winter season.

=== Toll Drive ===
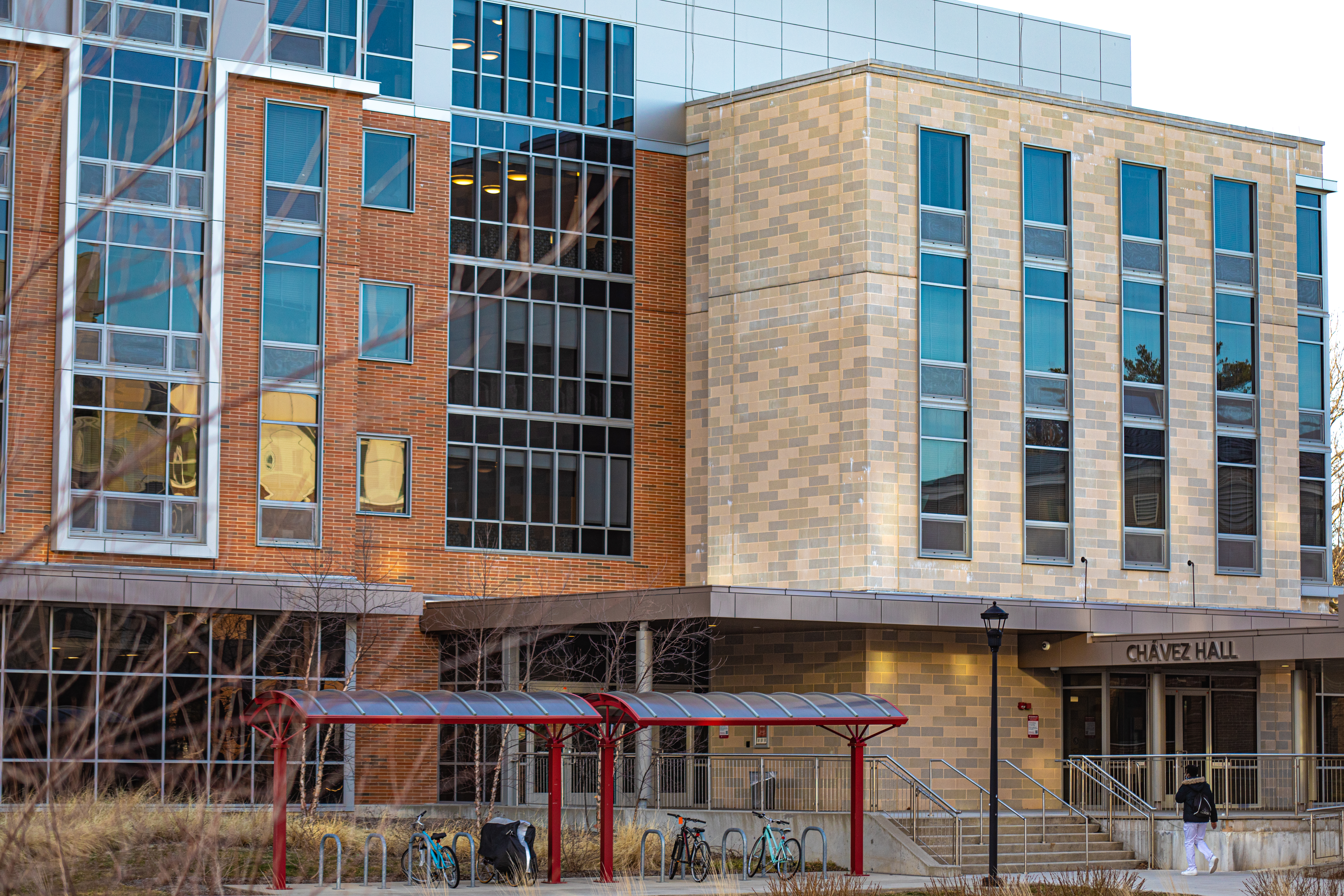
Chavez Hall

The Toll Drive residential halls are a complex consisting of two residence halls, Chavez Hall and Tubman Hall, as well as the connected East Side Dining facility. It opened in 2017 following three years of construction, which cost $124 million; $24 million in state bonds were issued for the project. The development includes 348,000 square feet of living space, which provides an additional 760 beds. This brought the total on-campus housing inventory to 10,300, making Stony Brook University the largest campus housing for any public school in the state of New York. The buildings feature a modern architectural design that feature ironspot brick, cast stone and glass. The buildings were named for Cesar Chavez and Harriet Tubman.

The connected East Side Dining center occupies an additional 68,000 square feet and includes 10 mini-restaurants as well as 12 kitchens. Its opening allowed Stony Brook University to fully shut down the Stony Brook Union and its dining services for renovation.

=== Graduate student housing ===
Graduate students at Stony Brook University reside in one of three locations: West G, the Schomburg Apartments, or the Chapin Apartments. The Schomburg Apartments were formerly referred to as the "Graduate Student Apartments" before being dedicated to Arthur Schomburg in 1992 after a wealthy donation. The Schomburg Apartments are catered towards single graduate students, but also accommodate married couples without children. The complex has two buildings for a total of 72 apartments, with apartments ranging from one to four bedrooms.

The Chapin Apartments are located on Stony Brook University's East Campus and was formerly known as Stage XVI before being named after the late Long Island singer-songwriter Harry Chapin in 1987. The Chapin Apartments are the only housing complex on campus that houses graduate students with families; it consists of 12 buildings with apartments ranging from one to four bedrooms. Children of graduate students who live in the Chapin Apartments attend the Three Village Central School District. The Chapin Apartments are situated near the Stony Brook University Hospital and the Health Sciences Center.

== East Campus ==
The East Campus of Stony Brook University, located to the east of Nicolls Road, is centered around medical facilities such as the Stony Brook University Hospital. The 360-foot Health Sciences Center is the tallest building on Long Island.

=== Stony Brook University Hospital ===
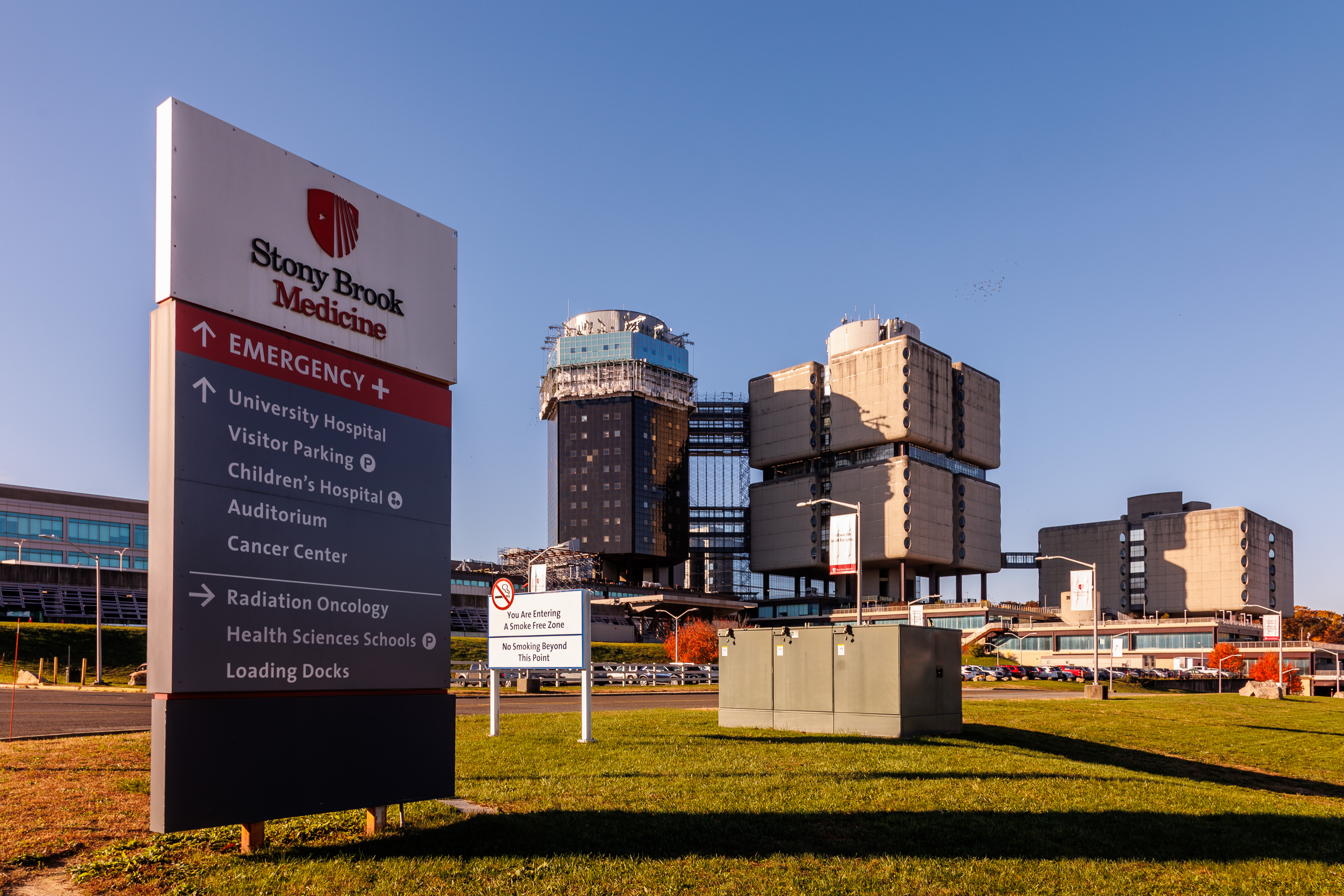
Stony Brook Medicine

The Stony Brook University Hospital is a 695-bed hospital that serves as Long Island's only tertiary care center as well as a Level 1 Adult and Pediatric Trauma Center. According to U.S. News & World Report, it is the 12th-ranked hospital in the state of New York and the 10th-ranked in the New York metropolitan area. The hospital is also nationally ranked 41st in Neurology and Neurosurgery and 49th in Orthopedics. It opened in 1980 and is affiliated with the Renaissance School of Medicine at Stony Brook University. It is one of four hospitals in the Stony Brook Medicine Health System, along with the Stony Brook Children's Hospital, Stony Brook Southampton Hospital, and Stony Brook Eastern Long Island Hospital.

Construction on the hospital began in 1976, designed by Chicago architect Bertrand Goldberg, which stands 334 feet tall and is enveloped by multi-level glass buildings. It was named the third-most beautiful hospital in the United States by Soliant Health in 2011.

=== Stony Brook Children's Hospital ===
The Stony Brook Children's Hospital is a children's hospital which opened in 2019 as a four-story, 71,500-square foot facility, which cost $73 million to construct as part of a larger expansion of Stony Brook Medicine. It is the only children's hospital on Long Island with single-patient rooms and the only children's teaching hospital.

=== Medical and Research Translation ===
The Medical and Research Translation (MART) building, located on Lauterbur Drive, is the home of the Stony Brook University Cancer Center. It opened in 2018 as an eight-story, 240,000-square foot building, which cost $194 million to construct. It was funded through a $35 million NYSUNY 2020 Challenge grant, $50 million from Jim Simons and $53 million from New York state senators Kenneth LaValle and John Flanagan. Four floors of the building are dedicated to research, while two floors are dedicated to outpatient cancer treatment for adults and children. It is the only facility of its kind on Long Island.

=== Carol M. Baldwin Breast Care Center ===
The Carol M. Baldwin Breast Care Center is located on Pellegrino Road and provides accessible screening, medical care, and support services regardless of patients’ ability to pay. It opened in 1995 and was dedicated in 1996 to Carol Baldwin, the mother of Alec Baldwin, Daniel Baldwin, William Baldwin and Stephen Baldwin, in honor of her role in raising funds for cancer research. It was the first cancer center in the state of New York to receive national accreditation from the National Accreditation Program for Breast Centers (NAPBC) and performs over 8,000 mammograms and 2,000 sonograms annually.

=== Ambulatory Surgery Center ===
The Ambulatory Surgery Center is a building dedicated to outpatient surgery for adults and pediatric patients. Located on Loop Road, the 32,000-square foot center opened in 2001 and contains eight operating suites, of which two are specifically devoted to ophthalmology. The center sees around 8,500 patients per year.

== Research and Development Park ==
Stony Brook University acquired the Research and Development Park in 2005 from the Gyrodyne Company of America through eminent domain. The 246-acre plot of land is located south of the main Stony Brook campus. In 2012, the state of New York paid Gyrodyne a $167.5 million settlement after the company sued over allegations that the state had undervalued the plot of land during the annexation in 2005. Gyrodyne currently still owns 68 acres of land on the site, which are used for office buildings and undeveloped property. Prominent Long Island leaders plan on filling the Research and Development Park with eleven buildings to "spark the region’s economy and fortify the eastern end of a 65-mile 'high-tech highway.'"

=== Center of Excellence in Wireless and Information Technology ===
The Center of Excellence in Wireless and Information Technology (CEWIT) was the first building to open in the new Research and Development Park; the 100,000-square foot building opened in 2008 and was designed by Mitchell Giurgola. The building contains forty research laboratories, 7,000 square feet of incubator space, a data center and offices. It cost $47.7 million to construct and its exterior is a steel framed system with concrete slab on a metal deck.

=== Advanced Energy Research and Technology Center ===
The Advanced Energy Research and Technology Center (AERTC) cost $35 million to construct and opened in 2010. It is a two-story, 43,000-square foot lab building devoted to research on alternative fuels and energy conservation. The building was named Green Project of the Year by NY Construction magazine due to being the most energy-efficient building in the state of New York. It is also one of 26 buildings in the United States to earn a platinum rating from the U.S. Green Building Council.

=== Innovation and Discovery Center ===
The Innovation and Discovery Center (IDC), scheduled to open in fall 2020 is a 68,000-square foot building that plans to be the home of start-up and incubator businesses which benefit from a tax-free statewide economic policy known as the Start-Up NY program. It is the second building in the Research and Development Park to be designed by Mitchell Giurgola. $60 million in New York state allocations were made in 2014 towards the construction of the building.

== Transportation ==
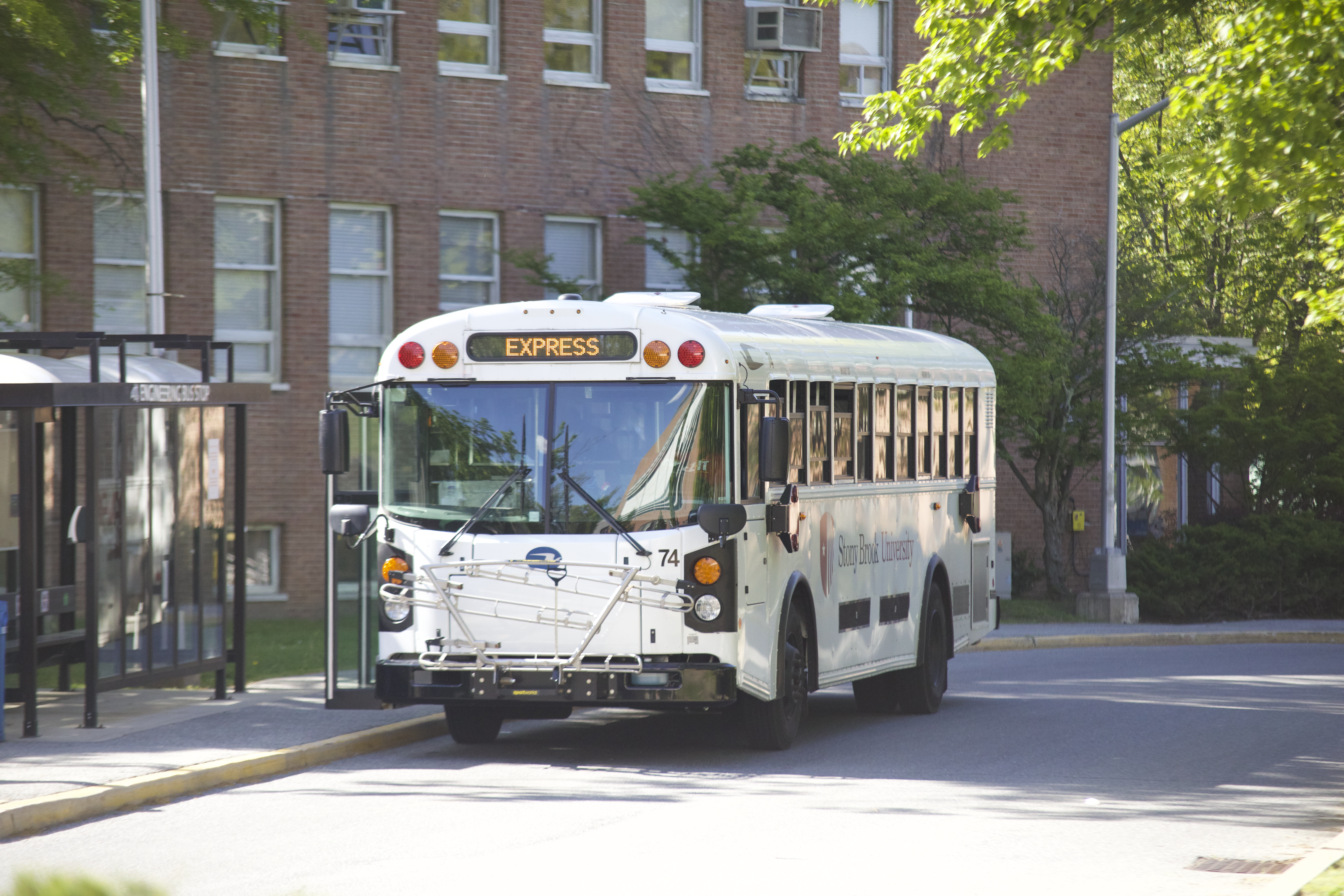
An SBU Transit bus on the Express Route at the Engineering Drive Loop stop

Stony Brook University is accessible via public transportation through the Stony Brook station on the Long Island Rail Road and multiple bus stops on campus for the Suffolk County Transit's S60, S69 and 3D routes.

The university also provides campus-operated "SBU Transit" shuttle buses, which connects Stony Brook's West, East and South campuses. Seven routes run on the weekdays: Hospital/Chapin Route, Outer Loop, Inner Loop, Express Route, Railroad Route, R&D Park Shuttle and Southampton Shuttle. Only the Hospital/Chapin Route, Outer Loop and R&D Park Shuttle routes run on weekends as well. Railroad Route 1, Railroad Route 2, Shopping Route East Campus and Shopping Route West Campus routes run on weekends only.

All of SBU Transit's weekday routes stop at the SAC Loop bus station, with the exception of the Express Route, which runs from the South P Lot to the Engineering Drive Loop and back.

== Education ==
The school district covering the census-designated place is the Three Village Central School District.
