= The Statesman (Stony Brook) =

- The Statesman, April 14, 2014
- Type: Student newspaper
- Format: Online; Print (1958–2020)
- Owner(s): Statesman Association Inc.
- Founded: 1957
- Headquarters: 100 Nicolls Road; 307F Student Activities Center; Stony Brook, NY, 11790
- Website: www.sbstatesman.com/

The Statesman is the official student newspaper of Stony Brook University. Founded in 1957 as The Sucolian, it is the longest-running student publication of the university and a print edition was published every Monday of the academic year until 2021.

The paper is owned by Statesman Association Inc. and is staffed by undergraduate students, who work as editorial board members, writers, multimedia staff, social media team members or web designers, among other roles. The Statesman has won awards from the Society of Professional Journalists, Newsday, and the Society for News Design, and its editors and writers have gone on to future careers in journalism.

The Statesman's office is located on the third floor of the Stony Brook Student Activities Center on the main campus.

== History ==
The Statesman was founded in the fall of 1957 as The Sucolian, its name originating from the abbreviation of the State University Campus on Long Island (SUCoLI), the former name of Stony Brook University when it was located in Oyster Bay, New York. The paper's name was changed to The Statesman in 1959, and the final issue of The Sucolian was dated April 9, 1959. The first issue of The Statesman was dated May 15, 1959.

In 1976, the Statesman Association Inc. was formed and given tax exempt status by the IRS.

In the 1970s, The Statesman published a 36-page issue three times a week.

The paper currently runs on funding from both advertisements and the Undergraduate Student Government at Stony Brook University. In 2010, The Statesman's funding was slashed by USG from $27,000 to $2,500, leading the paper to switch from a biweekly format to a weekly format. The paper was forced to cut costs in the year prior to the funding cut, including reducing the circulation of each issue by 1,000 copies, eliminating the paid staff advertiser position, and ceasing to cover travel expenses for its writers. USG alleged that operation of The Statesman had run a $24,000 deficit in the past year, and in response, The Statesman filed a protest.

In 2019, a story published in The Atlantic alleged that Stony Brook University administration members during Samuel L. Stanley's tenure as president had stifled journalists from The Statesman's attempts to report on matters that reflected poorly on the school. Restrictions on access by student journalists have continued since then.

In March 2020, as a result of the COVID-19 pandemic, The Statesman stopped printing for the first time since its first physical issue in 1958. On August 22, 2021, The Statesman announced that it would be ceasing its print edition effective indefinitely due to financial constraints brought upon by the pandemic and the need to adapt to a changing journalism landscape. Beginning fall 2022, print issues returned with monthly special issues of The Statesman.
