= Robert J. Frey =

American academic

Dr. Robert J. Frey is a former Managing Director of Renaissance Technologies Corp (1992–2004) and presently serves as a Research Professor on the faculty of Stony Brook University where he is the Founder and Director of the Program in Quantitative Finance within the Department of Applied Mathematics and Statistics. Frey obtained his Ph.D. in Applied Mathematics and Statistics from Stony Brook University in 1986. He is the Founder, and Chief Executive Officer of global fund of hedge funds group FQS Capital Partners.
