= Simon Baruch =

American physician (1840–1921)

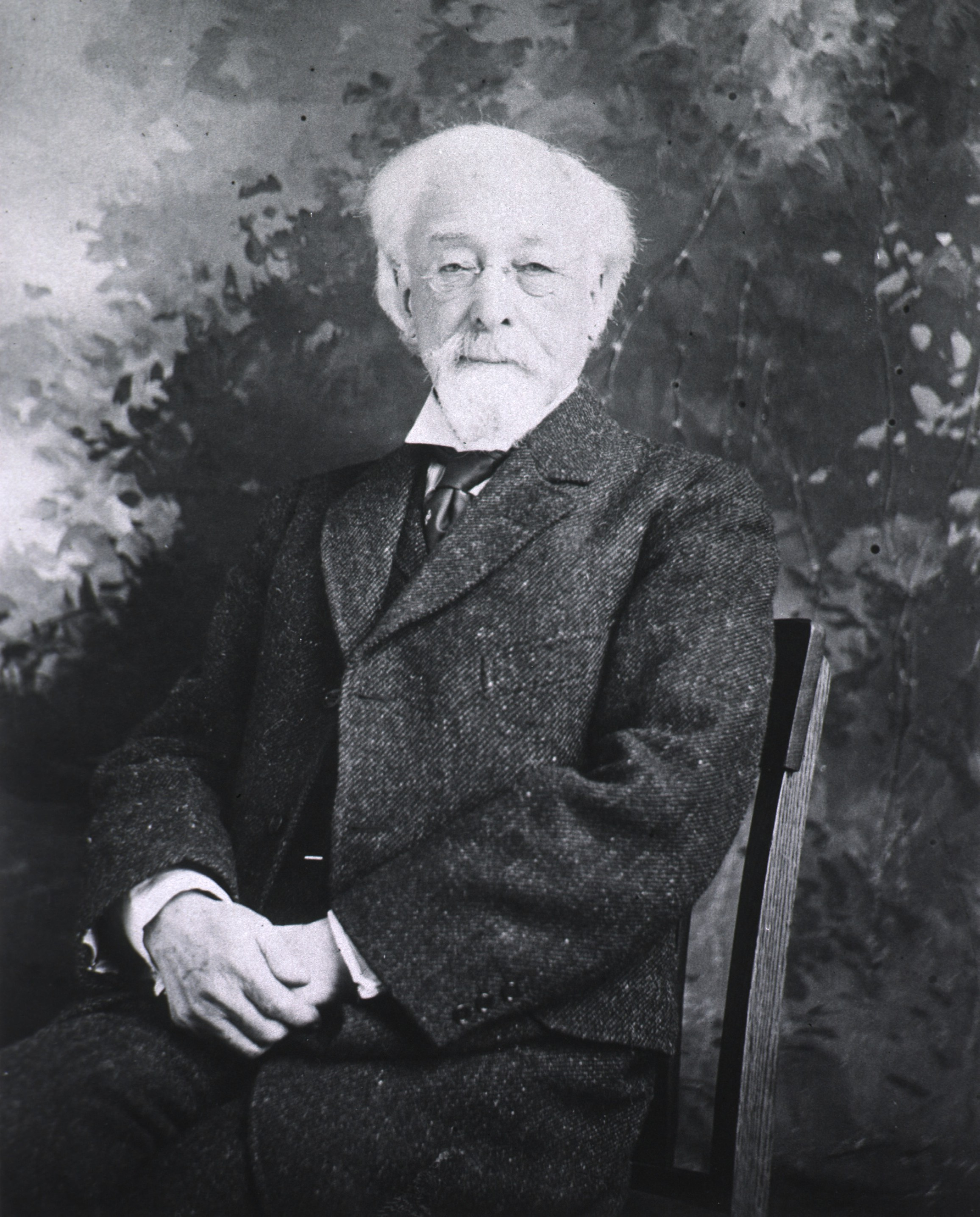
- Born: July 29, 1840; Schwersenz, Prussia
- Died: June 3, 1921 (aged 80); New York City, US
- Education: Medical College of the State of South Carolina; Medical College of Virginia
- Occupations: Physician, scholar
- Spouse: Isabelle Wolfe (m. 1867)
- Children: 4, including Bernard M. Baruch, Herman B. Baruch

Simon Baruch (July 29, 1840 – June 3, 1921) was a Prussian-American physician, scholar, and the foremost advocate of the urban public bathhouse to benefit public health in the United States. An American Civil War veteran of the Confederate States Army, after the war Baruch was a member of the Ku Klux Klan.

== Early life and education ==
Simon Baruch (Yiddish: שמעון ברוך), the son of Jewish parents Bernard (Yiddish: בערנארד ברוך) and Theresa (Green; Yiddish: טערעזאַ גרין באַרוך), was born in Schwersenz, Kingdom of Prussia. He attended the Royal Gymnasium in Posen. In 1855 he emigrated to South Carolina at 15 years old to live with the Manus Baum family five years after their arrival in America. Baruch worked for Manus Baum as a bookkeeper before beginning to study medicine in 1859. Baruch attended lectures at the Medical College of the State of South Carolina, and enrolled at the Medical College of Virginia (MCV), (now Virginia Commonwealth University) in Richmond, Virginia, where he received a medical degree in 1862.

Baruch began his career as a surgeon in the American Civil War; serving in the Confederate States Army and reportedly entering the service "without even having lanced a boil." He initially accepted a commission as assistant surgeon of the 3rd South Carolina Battalion on April 4, 1862, and in August of that same year, he transferred to the 13th Mississippi Infantry Regiment, in the position of surgeon. During the war, Baruch gained considerable surgical experience. After the Confederate defeat at Gettysburg in July 1863, he stayed on to treat the wounded for six weeks. Afterwards, he was imprisoned at Fort McHenry in Baltimore, Maryland, and he returned to his unit in December 1863. Following a period of ill health, he returned to the 13th Mississippi Regiment six months later, and he served until the end of the war.

At age six, Bernard Baruch and his eight year old brother Herman discovered an old trunk which contained their father's Confederate uniform as well as the robes and regalia of a Ku Klux Klan member. Simon's Klan activities became a point of pride for Bernard, in that he approved of the Klan's opposition to carpetbaggers and scalawags and believed it did not oppose Jews, Catholics, or free African-Americans.

In late 1865 Baruch went to New York City, where he worked as an attending physician to the Medical Polyclinic of the North-Western Dispensary in the Hell's Kitchen, Manhattan district of Manhattan – a bastion of poor and working-class people. There, Baruch tended to patients who were suffering from communicable infection, most of whom lacked access to clean bath water, fresh air, and sunshine. Dr. Baruch returned to Camden, South Carolina, in 1867.

== Medical career ==
For 16 years Baruch practiced medicine in South Carolina. He also advocated for the smallpox vaccination for the children of the state, and he helped to reactivate the South Carolina State Medical Association, serving as president. He held a position on the faculty of the South Carolina State Medical College, and he was chairman of the Board of Health, later renamed South Carolina Department of Health and Environmental Control. However, Baruch grew increasingly dissatisfied with the indiscriminate use of unproven medical remedies. He studied the healing philosophies of Austrian physician Vincent Priessnitz (1799–1852), and in particular, the success of a therapeutic spa in the Silesian Foothills. The remedies were largely predicated upon frequent bathing and irrigation of the gastrointestinal tract; an alternative form of medicine called hydrotherapy. Patients recuperated in a restful, calm environment, ate a prudent diet, eliminated alcohol and tobacco, and engaged in physical activity. Later, Baruch also credited Wilhelm Winternitz for his pioneering work in hydrotherapy. Baruch would go on to introduce medicinal spring therapies, known as balneology, and hydrotherapy to the United States of America.

In 1881, Baruch took up residence in New York City with his wife Belle, and their four sons, Hartwig ("Harty") Nathaniel (1868–1953), Bernard Mannes (1870–1965), Herman Benjamin (1872–1953), and Sailing Wolfe (1874–1963). He became known as an active public health advocate and medical writer. He also gained professional credibility for diagnosing the first case of perforating appendicitis successfully operated on, and in the widely publicized "child cruelty" case involving the musical prodigy Josef Hofmann, Baruch was the consulting physician. After examining Hofmann, Baruch recommended the boy musician rest and resume the lifestyle of a child. In 1892, Baruch became a fellow of the New York Academy of Medicine.

As a physician and scholar, Baruch's enduring interest in hydrotherapy guided many his professional and civic pursuits. He published the standard texts, The Uses of Water in Modern Medicine (1892), Therapeutic reflections: a plea for physiological remedies (1893), and The Principles and Practice of Hydrotherapy (1898). From 1903 to 1913, he taught a course in hydro-therapeutics, or methods of using water to treat various diseases, at New York Post Graduate Medical School and Hospital of the University of the State of New York. He resigned when hydrotherapy was made an elective subject of study. In 1910, Baruch wrote Lessons of half a century in medicine. In 1920, he authored Epitome of hydrotherapy for physicians, architects and nurses.

Notably, Baruch's interest in hydrotherapy led to his role as the country's foremost municipal bath advocate. Ever since his trip in the 1880s to study the public bath system of Germany, Baruch was a tireless advocate for free public baths in New York City, during a period of immigration in American history when newcomers flooded cities. After he studied hydrotherapy, and understood the utility of fresh water to the prevention of infection. Baruch worked tirelessly to educate public officials and the medical community about the importance of water to public health. For many years, the general public and civic leaders were skeptical about the debilitating effects of poor sanitation on physical health; pessimistic Mayor Hugh J. Grant (1852–1910) declared, "The people won't bathe." Despite decades of opposition, Baruch managed to convince three successive mayors of the utility of water, and in particular, the importance of a public bath system to the population health of the urban working class and poor. He wrote numerous journal and newspaper articles on the medical utility of water, including first article published in America on public baths for the Philadelphia Medical Times and Register on August 24, 1889. He reported on the structure, functioning, and health benefits of a public bath systems to the New York's Committee on Hygiene, in his role as chairman. Baruch also delivered addresses on the topic to medical and scientific societies. Moreover, Baruch was medical editor at the New York Sun from 1912 to 1918, and he covered all the major health concerns of the period, and wrote articles on a variety of topics, from the common cold to malarial fevers.

=== Public bathhouses ===
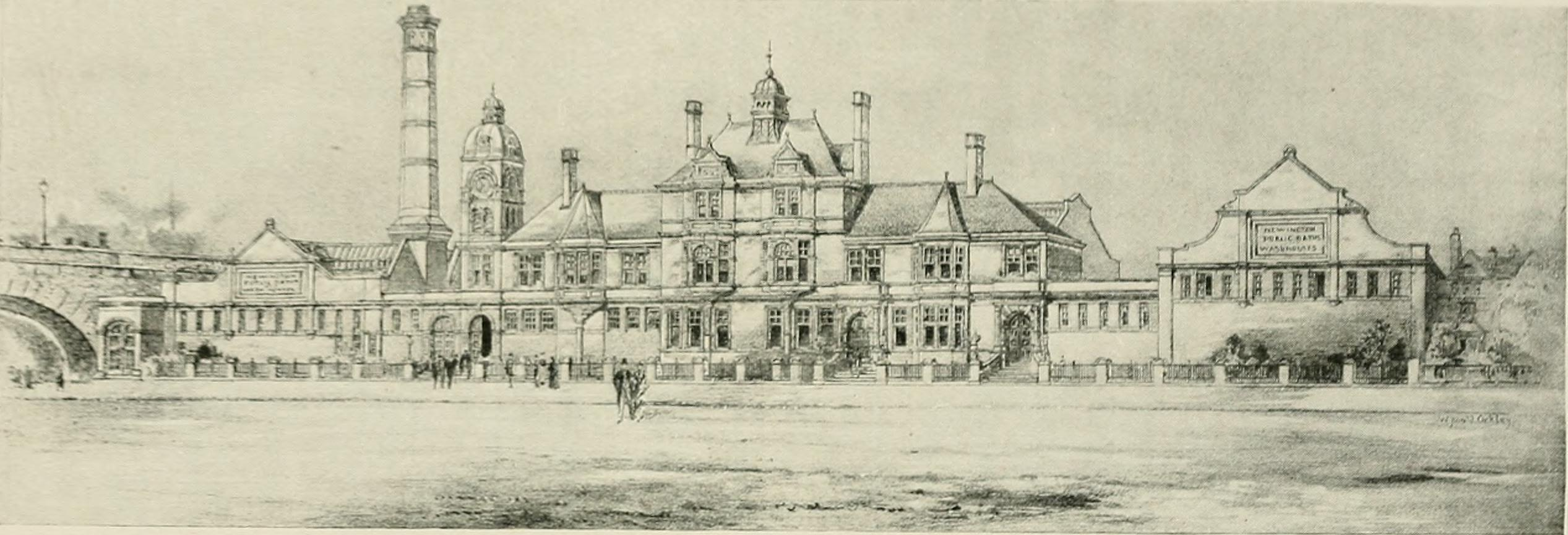
Report on public baths and public comfort stations by the Mayor's committee of New York City (1897) (14591088910)

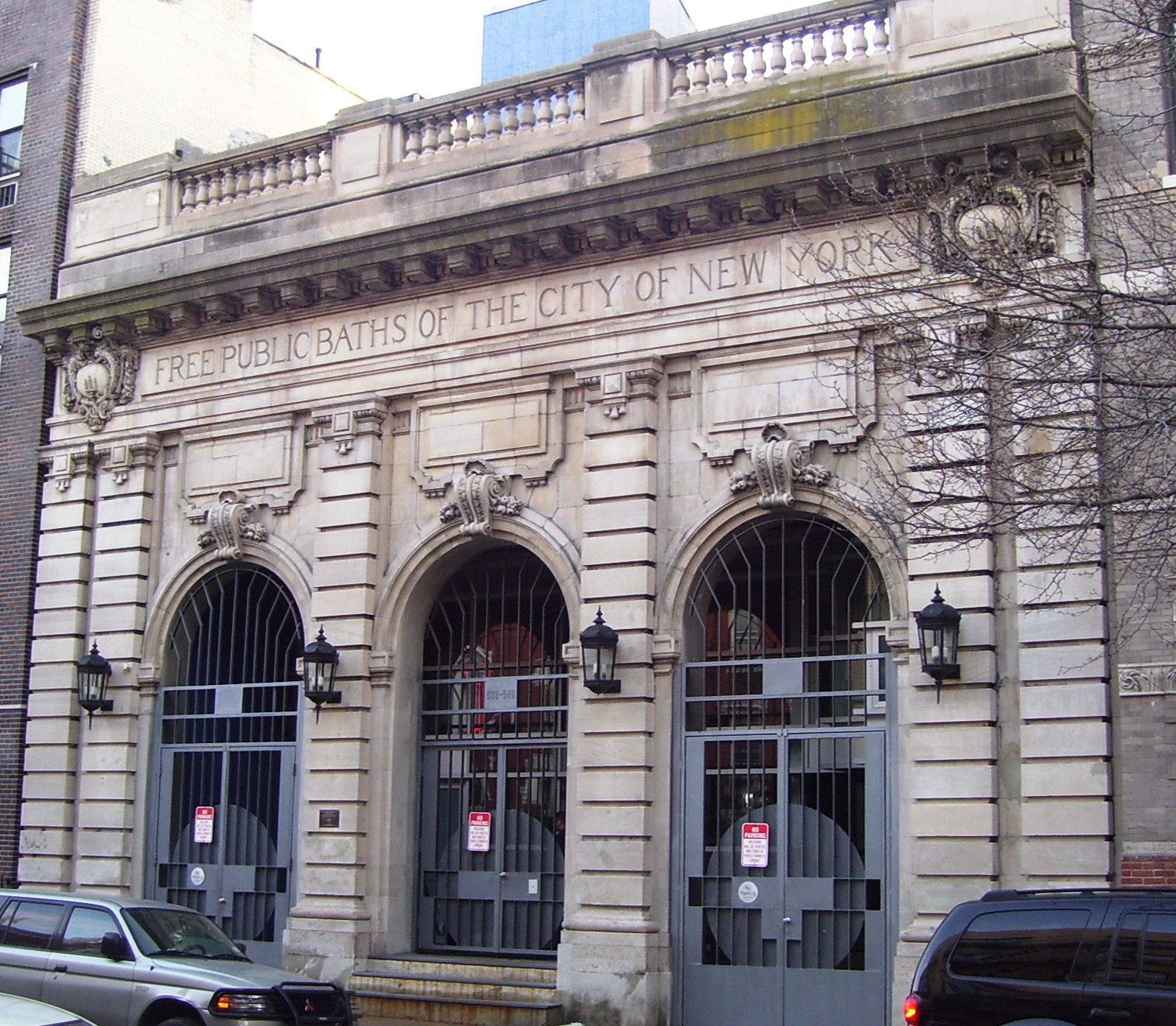
Free Public Baths 538 East 11th Street

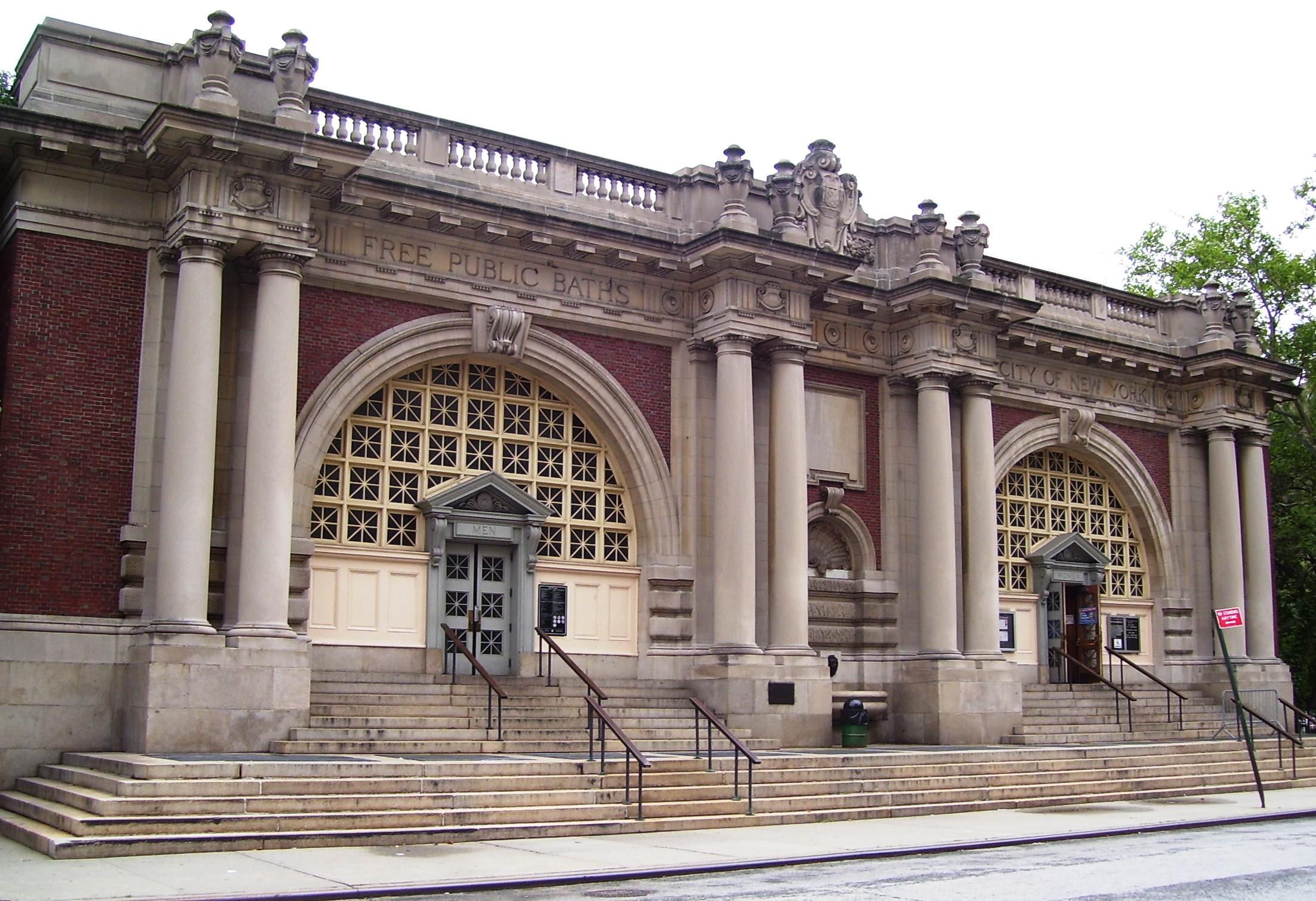
Asser Levy Recreation Center

Although Baruch was met with continual resistance, by 1895, he successfully persuaded the State Legislature to pass a law to obligate cities exceeding a population of 50,000 to establish and maintain free bathhouse facilities, and an order from the local Board of Alderman to construct a public bath in the City of New York. In 1897, 9 Centre Market Place People's Baths, located between Centre and Mulberry Streets, served as a prototype public bathhouse. Financed by private contributions from the Association for Improving the Condition of the Poor (AICP), and built on land owned by the City Mission and the Tract Society, the facility provided more than 100,000 people a year with a bath, soap, and a towel for five cents. In 1901, Baruch and his colleagues, Deputy Commissioner of Health of the City of New York Fowler and Dr. Van Santvoord, presided over the opening of the first free public bathhouse, Rivington Street municipal bath, located at 326 Rivington, on the Lower East Side of Manhattan. The bathhouse facility featured indoor and outdoor bathing pools, 45 showers and five soaking tubs for men, and 22 showers for women. Other public baths of the period, credited to the advocacy of Baruch, include the Clarkson Street Bathhouse, located at 83 Carmine Street in Greenwich Village, which provided showers, tubs, and a gymnasium complex on two floors, as well as an open-air classroom on the rooftop for children in poor health. The facility has since become part of the Tony Dapolito Recreation Center. In 1904, several more free public baths opened in Manhattan, including the Milbank Memorial Bath, located at 325–327 East 38th Street, a gift to the City of New York by a Borden (company) heiress, which had the capacity to hold 3,000 people. That same year, the City opened West 60th Street Bathhouse, now Gertrude Elderle Recreation Center, providing 49 showers for men and 20 for women. In 1905, The Public Baths, designed by prominent architect Arnold W. Brunner, opened at 538 East 11th Street, between Avenues A and B, in the Alphabet City area of the East Village neighborhood of Manhattan; the building is also on the List of New York City Designated Landmarks in Manhattan below 14th Street. Asser Levy Public Baths opened in 1906, at the corner of Asser Levy Place and East 23rd Street, in the Kips Bay area. Also designed by architect Arnold W. Brunner and Martin Aiken, the facility has since become part of the Asser Levy Recreation Center, and the building is a designated historic landmark.

In 1912, Dr. Baruch was appointed the founding president of the American Association for Promoting Hygiene and Public Baths, a position he held until his death. Baruch said he had "done more to save life and prevent the spread of disease in my work for public baths than in all ... work as a physician."

== Family ==
On November 27, 1867, Simon Baruch married Isabelle "Belle" Wolfe (1850–1921), daughter of cotton farmer Sailing Wolfe of Winnsboro, South Carolina. Their son Bernard M. Baruch went on to a successful career on Wall Street and was a financial advisor to U.S. Presidents from Woodrow Wilson to Harry S. Truman; his substantial fortune afforded him the opportunity to endow university chairs, medical school facilities, and public buildings in his father's name. Herman B. Baruch followed his father's footsteps to become a physician, and then a diplomat, and president of the Simon Baruch Foundation. Hartwig Baruch was an actor, and Sailing Baruch was a banker and stockbroker.

Simon Baruch died at his home in New York on June 3, 1921.

== Legacy ==
Simon Baruch is the namesake of civil monuments, educational entities, and academic departments in New York City, and throughout the country, many of which were established by his son Bernard M. Baruch, including Simon Baruch Houses, a public housing complex in Manhattan, as well as buildings, halls, and academic chairs at Columbia University, Clemson University, New York University College of Medicine, and the Medical College of Virginia/ VCU. New York City Department of Education's Middle School 104 is named Simon Baruch Middle School, along with an adjacent Simon Baruch Playground and Garden, under the auspices of the New York City Department of Parks.

In 1933, the Simon Baruch Research Institute of Balneology at Saratoga Springs Spa, Saratoga Springs, New York was established.

In 1940, Bernard M. Baruch endowed in honor of Simon Baruch, the Simon Baruch Auditorium building on the campus of the Medical University of South Carolina, Charleston, South Carolina, the Department of Physical Medicine and Rehabilitation at Virginia Commonwealth University as well as the university's Egyptian Building, designed by architect Thomas Somerville Stewart, now a National Historic Landmark.

Biannually, the Richmond, Virginia chapter of the United Daughters of the Confederacy grants the Mrs. Simon Baruch University Award to a work of scholarly research on Southern history.
