= James Dudley Fooshe =

American soldier, philosopher, and author

James Dudley Fooshe (1844–1940), known as J. D. Fooshe, was a soldier, author, farmer, philosopher, Methodist churchman and one of the last surviving Confederate veterans in Richmond Co., Georgia. He was a prolific writer of articles that dealt with reminiscences of the American Civil War and his philosophy of religion, social conduct and political economy.

== Early life ==
He was born March 29, 1844, in Abbeville District (now Greenwood County, South Carolina). He grew up near the Coronaca community, where Methodism made rapid strides during the 19th century. His parents were John Wright Fooshe (December 26, 1815 - December 25, 1888) and Martha Richardson (March 4, 1820 - May 26, 1883), descendants of up-country South Carolinians. He married, December 31, 1866, Mary Ann “Mollie” Fuller (December 17, 1848 - March 20, 1918) daughter of Jones Fuller (December 17, 1848 - October 6, 1868) and Narcissa Harris (November 11, 1807 - September 19, 1860) who bore him twelve children.

== Noted Confederate Veteran ==
He joined Company A, James Battalion of South Carolina in the army of the Confederate States of America and served throughout the Civil War; being wounded during the first Maryland invasion and taken prisoner by the Union army. Shortly paroled, he was furloughed to recover from his wounds and returned to service only to be wounded again at the Battle of the Wilderness. He again recovered and returned to service, this time, in the Quartermaster Corps as secretary to Dr. Simon Baruch, father of Bernard Baruch, the noted presidential advisor.

== Progressive Citizen ==
He was born into the Methodist Church, saw it divided into North and South, and heartily approved the merger that made Methodists one church again. On the argument for reuniting the church, he stated: "I fought for the Confederacy and lived to see it become greater under the flag of the United States. I want to see our churches exercise the same forbearance that we who once fought with bullets instead of doctrines, have exercised."

He was a champion of a reunified nation and the up building of a better United States. His words shadowed the differences of a divided nation and called for the advancement of one nation standing together in all things.

== Life in Georgia ==
Taking up residence in Richmond County, Georgia at the age of 60, he took a sand hills plantation and turned it into one of the garden spots of the county. He became a noted authority on bee culture and promoter of diversification in agriculture. At age 70 he planted a peach orchard and lived long enough to replant it twice.

He was in the limelight of the fight for prohibition and public education. He believed in good roads, education for all who would take it, and the homely virtues of thrift which the hard days after the Civil War had impressed upon him. He practically abandoned the growing of cotton while cotton was still “King” and became an enthusiastic champion of terracing, heavy fertilizing and grafting fruit trees for which he became noted for the high grade of his farm products, especially peaches.

He was critical of newfangled ways of approaching social and economic problems, but never critical of material progress. The slaughter in 1934 of millions of pigs to relieve overproduction was labeled by him "a crime in the sight of God." A similar outburst of wrath greeted the plowing up of cotton, while many of the measures of relief were seen by him as a "sure way to make a nation of loafers instead of workers." At age 90, he tired of his hand writing and learned to use a typewriter. To those who smiled at the idea, he retorted: "When a man quits doing something new, he is already dead."

The same philosophy led him to replant his peach orchards for a third time at age 93. He had just begun to gather fruit from the last orchard when he died on January 11, 1940, at Gracewood just outside Augusta, GA, at age 95. He was buried at Magnolia Cemetery in Augusta.

Quotation: "When a fellow gets as old as I am, he appreciates more than anything else the solitude of home and the quiet friendship of those he sees often."

Memoirs of J. D. Fooshe appeared as a series of articles in The Augusta Herald* in the Spring of 1936:

1. Confederate Army Camp Life In Early War Days Is Related
2. Reminiscences of the 'Sixties
3. Wounded, Captured, Mr. Fooshe Sends Letter Home by a Spy
4. Exchanged, Mr. Fooshe Given Furlough and Allowed to Come Home Until Wound Was Better
5. Becomes Member of Courier Staff of Chief Supply Man for General Lee's Forces
6. Carpet-Baggers Flock to South
7. J.D. Fooshe Tells of His Early Life on Farm After Civil War
8. Three Lifetime Lessons Early in Married Life
9. Compares Present Conditions With Those of Many Years Ago
10. J.D. Fooshe Adds Raising of Bees as Sideline to Farming
11. Bee Industry One of Finest Nature Studies, Says Fooshe
