= Belle W. Baruch =

American equestrian and philanthropist (1899–1964)

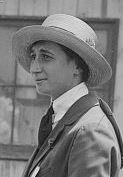
- Born: Belle Wilcox Baruch; August 16, 1899
- Died: April 25, 1964 (aged 64); New York, U.S.
- Known for: Equestrianism, aviator, benefactor.
- Father: Bernard Baruch

Belle Wilcox Baruch (August 16, 1899 – April 25, 1964) was an American equestrian, philanthropist, and the daughter of financier Bernard Baruch.

== Biography ==
Belle Wilcox Baruch was born on August 16, 1899, the daughter of Annie (née Griffin) and Bernard Baruch. Her paternal grandfather was Simon Baruch, a physician. Her uncle was Herman B. Baruch, also a physician.

Baruch was a noted athlete who excelled as an equestrian, sailor and hunter. In 1930 and 1931, she was awarded the President of the Republic's Cup for winning the classic competition in the Paris horse show and, in the 1931 competition, she was the only one of 119 contestants to post a perfect score. All told, she won more than 300 prizes in competitions in France and other countries.

When the U.S. embassy in France would not issue her a license to ride in international shows because she was a woman, she obtained one from the French. She was, however, unable to achieve her ambition of competing in the Olympics as women could not join the equestrian team before 1956.

== Legacy ==
Her legacy is preserved in the Belle W. Baruch Institute for Marine and Coastal Sciences (University of South Carolina) and the Belle W. Baruch Institute of Coastal Ecology & Forest Science (Clemson University) both established on Hobcaw Barony, a former rice plantation purchased by her father. Upon her death in 1964, the property was transferred to the Belle W. Baruch Foundation for the creation of a nature and research preserve. Hobcaw Barony is located on Waccamaw Neck in Georgetown County, South Carolina.
