= Hobcaw =

Hobcaw may refer to:

- Hobcaw Barony, also known as Bellefield Plantation, a tract of land in Georgetown County, South Carolina, in the United States
- USS Hobcaw (SP-252), a United States Navy patrol vessel, towing boat, and ferryboat in commission from 1917 to 1918
