= Bernard Baruch =

American businessman (1870–1965)

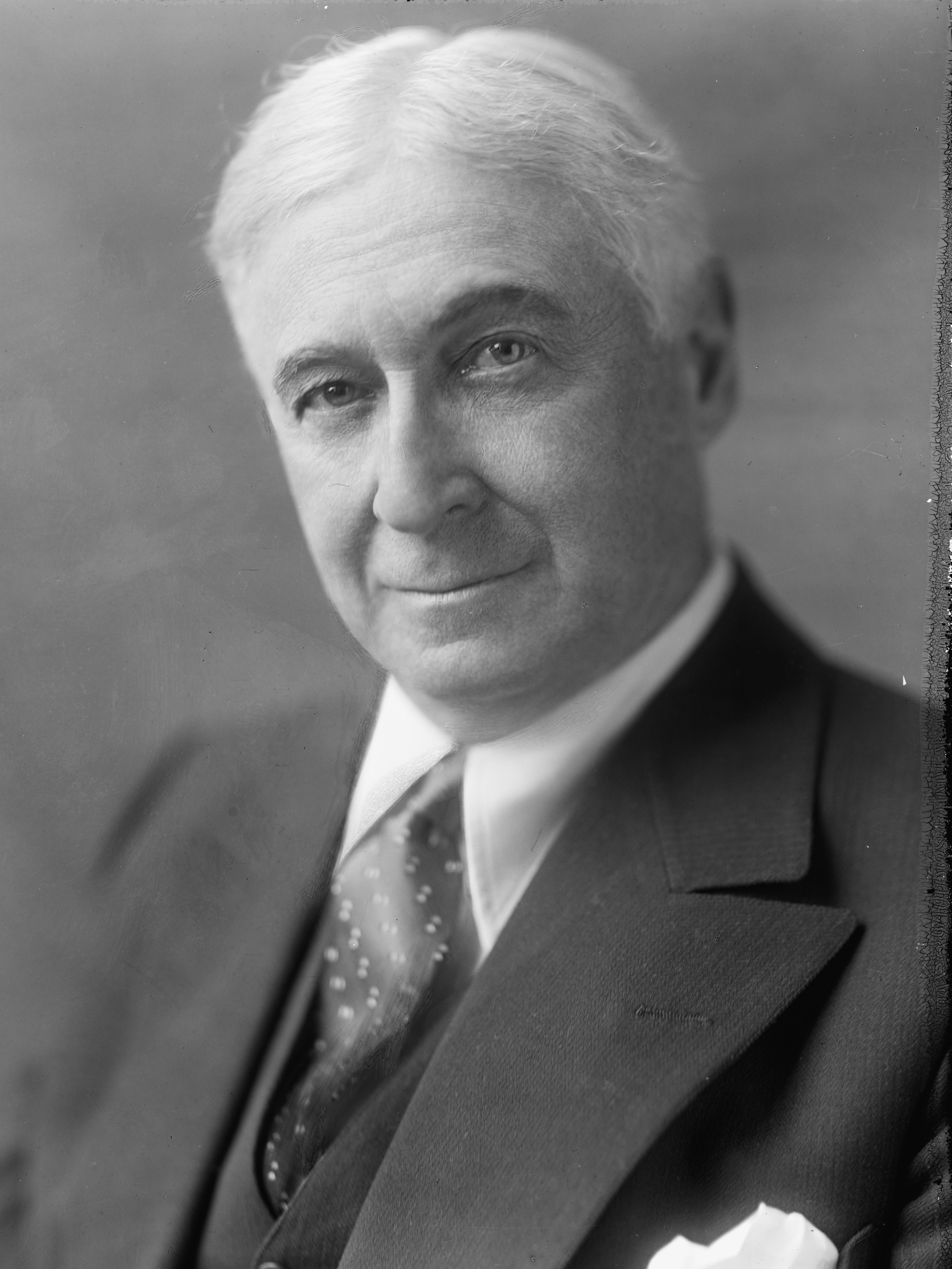
- Baruch, 1905–1945
- Born: Bernard Mannes Baruch; August 19, 1870; Camden, South Carolina, U.S.
- Died: June 20, 1965 (aged 94); New York City, U.S.
- Education: City College of New York (BA)
- Occupations: Financier; stock investor; statesman; political consultant
- Spouse: Annie Griffen (m. 1897)
- Children: 3, including Belle W.
- Father: Simon Baruch
- Honors: Bernard Baruch Handicap at Saratoga Race Course

Bernard Mannes Baruch (Note: During his life, Baruch's name was more often pronounced with stress on the first syllables of both his first and last names, i.e. /ˈbɜːrnərd ˈbɑːruːk/ BUR-nərd BAR-ook. Current sources more typically stress the second syllable of each name, i.e. /bərˈnɑːrd bəˈruːk/ bər-NARD bər-OOK. Both pronunciations are given in World Words, Recommended Pronunciations (1948). Baruch himself wrote that "the name Baruch is pronounced differently by different members of the family...The first syllable should be pronounced as if it were spelled 'Baah' and the second syllable as if spelled 'rook,' pronounced to rhyme with 'spook.'") (August 19, 1870 – June 20, 1965) was an American financier and statesman.

After amassing a fortune on the New York Stock Exchange, he impressed President Woodrow Wilson by managing the nation's economic mobilization in World War I as chairman of the War Industries Board. He advised Wilson during the Paris Peace Conference. He made another fortune in the postwar bull market, but foresaw the Wall Street crash and sold out well in advance.

In World War II, he became a close advisor to President Franklin D. Roosevelt on the role of industry in war supply. He was credited with greatly shortening the production time for tanks and aircraft. Later he helped to develop rehabilitation programs for injured servicemen. In 1946, he was the United States representative to the United Nations Atomic Energy Commission, though his Baruch Plan for international control of atomic energy was rejected by the Soviet Union.

== Early life and education ==
Bernard Baruch was born on August 19, 1870, in Camden, South Carolina, to a Jewish family. His parents were Belle (née Wolfe) and Simon Baruch, a physician and Confederate surgeon. Bernard was the second of four sons, including brothers Herman B. Baruch, Sailing Wolfe Baruch, and Hartwig Nathaniel Baruch.

At the age of 10, Baruch and his family moved from Camden to New York City. At the age of 14, he began attending the City College of New York in northern Manhattan. He later graduated from the college.

== Business career ==
Baruch became a broker and then a partner in A.A. Housman & Company. With his earnings and commissions, he bought a seat on the New York Stock Exchange for $19,000 (equivalent to $740,000 in 2025). There, he amassed a fortune before the age of 30 speculating on the sugar market, which was booming in Hawaii. Baruch founded the Intercontinental Rubber Company of New York, which dominated the guayule rubber market in the U.S. with holdings in Mexico. His partners in the enterprise were Senator Nelson Aldrich, Daniel Guggenheim, John D. Rockefeller Jr., George Foster Peabody, and others. By 1903, Baruch had his own brokerage firm and gained the reputation of being "The Lone Wolf of Wall Street" because of his refusal to join any financial house. By 1910, he had become one of Wall Street's best-known financiers.

After 1924, Baruch made millions in the bull market. By 1927 he had grown skeptical that the trend could continue, chastened by losses he had taken in the collapse of the Florida real estate bubble. A common anecdote holds that he sold his stock portfolio after a shoeshiner struck up a conversation with him about the market. In Baruch's own telling, a beggar whom he had often helped with money offered him a tip near the 1929 market peak, but by that time he had already reduced his market exposure. Unnerved by the Federal Reserve's interest rate cuts in summer 1927, he confided his doubts to other businessmen and began selling his stocks in favor of bonds, cash and gold, also selling stocks short periodically. On September 25, 1929, after the peak of the Dow, Baruch refused to join a bull pool of financiers to support the declining market. He advised humorist Will Rogers to exit the market before the crash; Rogers did so and later told Baruch "you saved my life".

== Presidential adviser ==
=== World War I ===
In 1916, Baruch left Wall Street to advise President Wilson on national defense and terms of peace. He served on the Advisory Commission to the Council of National Defense and in January 1918, became the chairman of the new War Industries Board. With his leadership, the body successfully managed the U.S.'s economic mobilization during World War I. In 1919, Wilson asked Baruch to serve as a staff member at the Paris Peace Conference. Baruch did not approve of the reparations which France and Britain demanded of Germany, and he supported Wilson's opinion that there needed to be new forms of cooperation, as well as the creation of the League of Nations.

For his services in support of the war effort, Baruch was awarded the Army Distinguished Service Medal with the following citation:

The President of the United States of America, authorized by Act of Congress, July 9, 1918, takes pleasure in presenting the Army Distinguished Service Medal to Mr. Bernard M. Baruch, a United States Civilian, for exceptionally meritorious and distinguished services to the Government of the United States, in a duty of great responsibility during World War I, in the organization and administration of the War Industries Board and in the coordination of allied purchases in the United States. By establishing a broad and comprehensive policy for the supervision and control of the raw materials, manufacturing facilities, and distribution of the products of industry, he stimulated the production of war supplies, coordinated the needs of the military service and the civilian population, and contributed alike to the completeness and speed of the mobilization and equipment of the military forces and the continuity of their supply. War Department, General Orders No. 15 (1921)

=== Interwar period ===
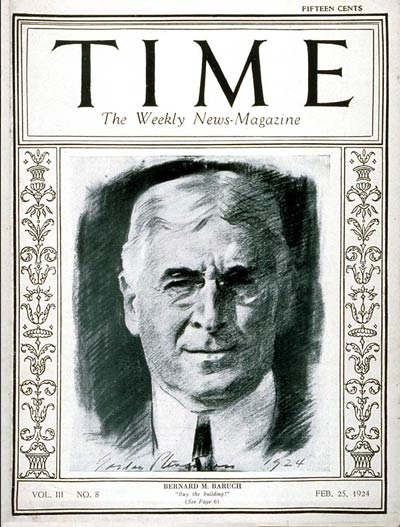
Time cover, February 25, 1924

In the 1920s and 1930s, Baruch expressed his concern that the United States needed to be prepared for the possibility of another world war. He wanted a more powerful version of the War Industries Board, which he saw as the only way to ensure maximum coordination between civilian business and military needs. Baruch remained a prominent government adviser during that time, and frequently advised Franklin D. Roosevelt on international finance and foreign policy after his election to the presidency.

Baruch was also a major contributor to Eleanor Roosevelt's controversial initiative to build a resettlement community for unemployed mining families in Arthurdale, West Virginia southeast of Morgantown. The relationship did not stop the congressional Nye Committee from investigating Baruch's role in war profiteering.

In 1940, responding to pleas to help Harry Truman's shoestring bid for reelection to the U.S. Senate, Baruch provided crucial funding.

=== World War II ===
When the United States entered World War II, Roosevelt appointed Baruch a special adviser to the director of the Office of War Mobilization. His offices at this time were at 120 Broadway. Baruch supported what was known as a "work or fight" bill. He advocated the creation of a permanent super-agency similar to his old Industries Board. His theory enhanced the role of civilian businessmen and industrialists in determining what was needed and who would produce it. Baruch's ideas were largely adopted, with James Byrnes appointed to carry them out. It is estimated that these policies cut two years off the time taken to produce tanks, bombers, etc. and caught Hitler totally by surprise. During World War II, Baruch remained a trusted adviser and confidant of Roosevelt, who in 1944 spent a month as a guest at Baruch's South Carolina estate, Hobcaw Barony near Georgetown.

In February 1943, Roosevelt invited Baruch to replace the widely criticized War Production Board head Donald M. Nelson. Baruch had long coveted the job, and responded that he only needed to ask his doctor if he was healthy enough for the post. During the delay, however, presidential advisor Harry Hopkins persuaded Roosevelt that firing Nelson at the army's demands would make him look weak, and when Roosevelt and Baruch met at the White House, Roosevelt declined to discuss the job offer further.

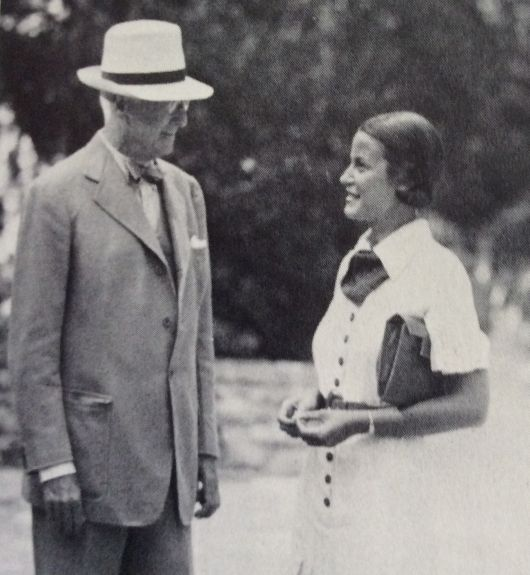
Baruch with writer Helen Lawrenson

In 1944, Baruch commissioned a committee of physicians which developed recommendations for the formal establishment of the medical specialty of Physical Medicine and Rehabilitation and provided over a million dollars of funding to many medical schools to further this cause. Baruch's father, Simon Baruch, had been a surgeon and was the first teacher of physical medicine at Columbia University in Manhattan. In the same year, Baruch and Dr. Howard Rusk, an Air Force physician, advised Roosevelt to expand rehabilitation programs for injured soldiers within all the armed forces. After the war, these programs were adopted by the Veterans' Administration.

In 1946, President Harry S. Truman appointed Baruch as the United States representative to the United Nations Atomic Energy Commission. On Friday, June 14, 1946, Baruch presented his Baruch Plan, a modified version of the Acheson–Lilienthal plan, to the UNAEC, which proposed international control of then-new atomic energy. The Soviet Union rejected Baruch's proposal as unfair given the fact that the U.S. already had nuclear weapons; it proposed that the U.S. eliminate its nuclear weapons before a system of controls and inspections was implemented. A stalemate ensued.

Baruch resigned from the commission in 1947. His influence began to diminish, as his opinions grew further out-of-step with those of the Truman administration.

== Later life and death ==
Baruch was well-known and often walked or sat in Washington, D.C.'s Lafayette Park. A popular story exists which claims that Baruch disliked being driven to the White House and would sit on a bench waiting for a signal light indicating the president was ready to see him. That led to him being nicknamed "the Park Bench Statesman". In 1960, on his ninetieth birthday, a commemorative park bench in Lafayette Park across from the White House was dedicated to Baruch by the Boy Scouts. A life-size bronze of Baruch sitting on a park bench is in the lobby of Baruch College's Vertical Campus in Manhattan.

He continued to advise on international affairs until his death from a heart attack on June 20, 1965, at his home in New York City, at the age of 94. His funeral at Temple Shaaray Tefila, the family synagogue, was attended by 700 people. His grave is in Flushing Cemetery in Flushing, Queens, New York City.

== Personal life ==
Baruch owned a string of thoroughbred racehorses and raced under the name "Kershaw Stable". In 1927, his horse, Happy Argo, won the Carter Handicap.

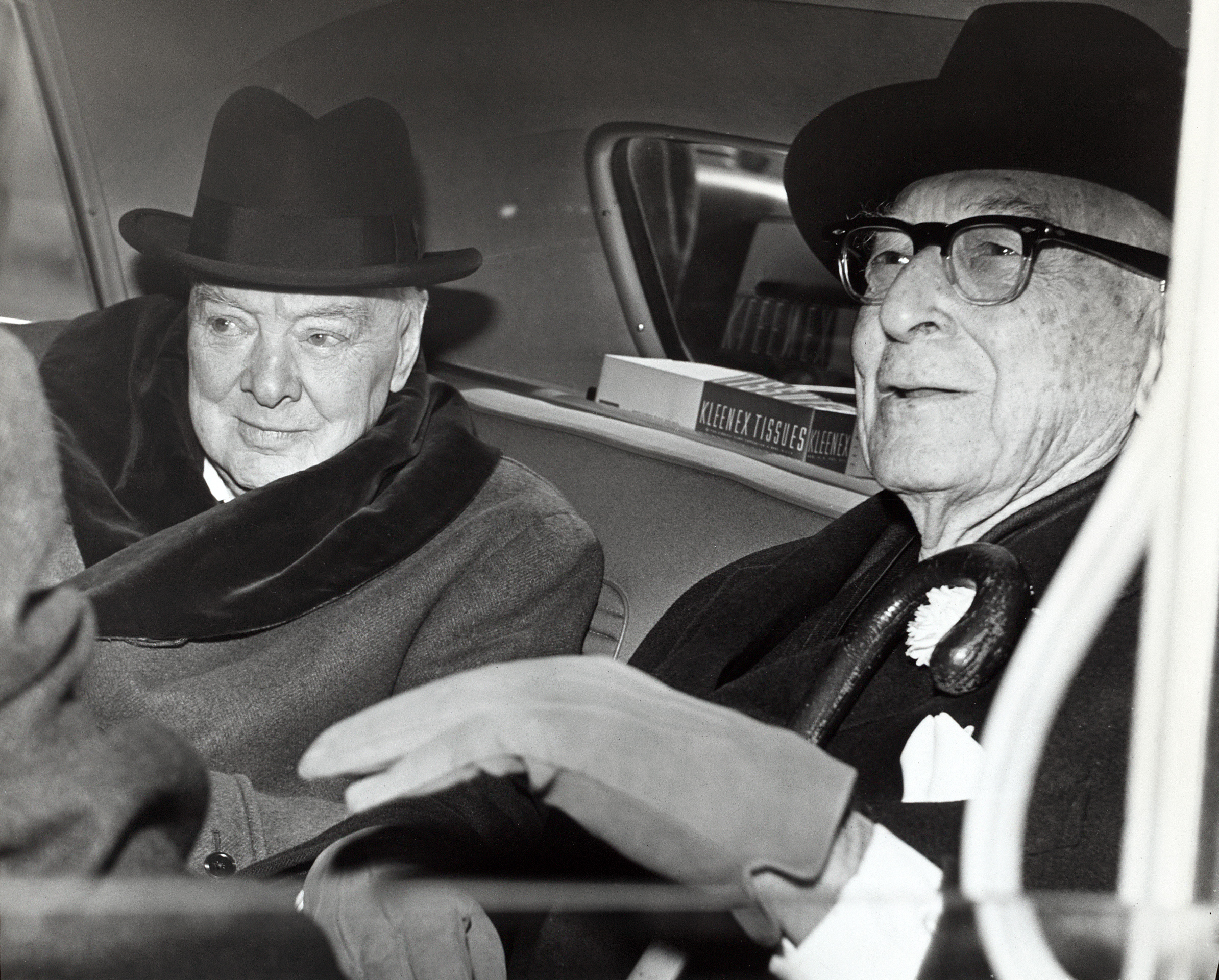
Winston Churchill and Baruch converse in the back seat of a car in front of Baruch's home

Winston Churchill and Baruch were personal friends. Churchill sometimes stayed in Baruch's New York home when visiting the United States after World War II.

=== Family ===
Baruch married Annie Griffen, an Episcopalian, of New York in 1897. Her father did not consent to the marriage or attend their wedding but later reconciled with Bernard. The couple had three children: Belle Baruch; Bernard Baruch Jr.; and Renée Baruch. Their daughters grew up Episcopalian, while Bernard Jr. was allowed to choose his faith.

His daughter, Belle Baruch, an avid sportsperson, never married. His son, Bernard Baruch Jr., was married to Winifred Beatrice Mann from 1932 to 1945. His daughter Renee married Henry Robert Samstag.

=== Hobcaw Barony ===
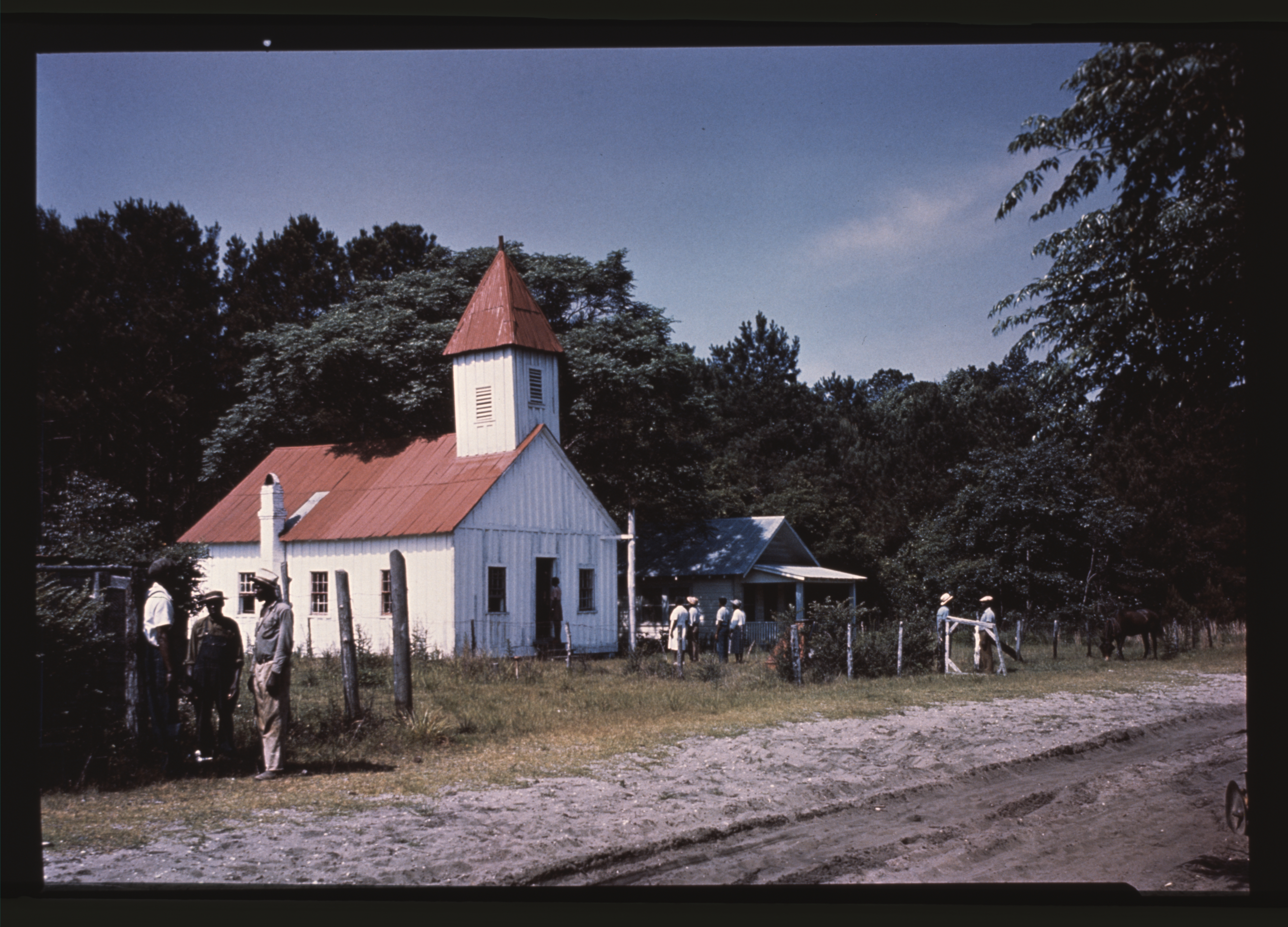
Negro quarters, with church, Hobcaw Barony also known as Bellefield Plantation near Georgetown, South Carolina

Between 1905 and 1907, Baruch purchased about 16,000 acres (6,500 ha) of the 18th-century Hobcaw Barony, consolidating 14 plantations on Waccamaw Neck in Georgetown County, South Carolina, between the Winyah Bay and the Atlantic Ocean. He developed sections of the property as a winter hunting resort and later sold the property to his eldest child, Belle. Upon her death in 1964, the property was transferred to The Belle W. Baruch Foundation as the Hobcaw Barony educational and research preserve. The property includes 37 historic buildings from the 18th- and 19th-century rice cultivation industry, and early-to-mid-20th-century winter resorts. The entire property was named to the National Register of Historic Places on November 2, 1994.

The Trustees of The Belle W. Baruch Foundation subsequently picked the University of South Carolina in Columbia and Clemson University in Clemson to preserve and study the Hobcaw Barony, including the wetlands forest and coastal ecosystems. The University of South Carolina established the Belle W. Baruch Institute for Marine and Coastal Sciences, and Clemson University established the Belle W. Baruch Institute for Marine and Coastal Sciences. Both universities have formed partnerships with other schools in South Carolina whose research and educational programs contribute to knowledge of coastal ecosystems. The Belle W. Baruch Foundation and the North Inlet-Winyah Bay National Estuarine Research Reserve jointly operate the Hobcaw Barony Discovery Center and provide tours and special programs.

== Legacy and honors ==
According to historian Thomas A. Krueger:

For half a century Bernard Baruch was one of the country's richest and most powerful men. A great speculator, public official, presidential counselor, political benefactor, and indefatigable almoner, his public life provides a clear view of the inner workings of the American political system.

In 1925, Baruch endowed the Mrs. Simon Baruch University Award to the United Daughters of the Confederacy in memory of his mother, to support scholars who had written unpublished monographs for full-length books on Confederate history. His mother had been an early member of the organization and supported its activities.

Baruch (along with Adlai Stevenson II) chose to donate his personal papers to Princeton University out of admiration for Woodrow Wilson and Dean Mathey.

- Baruch College of the City University of New York was named for him.
- The Saratoga Race Course named the Bernard Baruch Handicap in his honor.
- He was awarded an honorary Doctor of Laws degree in 1933 by Oglethorpe University in Brookhaven, Georgia.
- Bernard M. Baruch Houses, or Baruch Houses, is a public housing development built by the New York City Housing Authority (NYCHA) on the Lower East Side of Manhattan, is named for him.

=== In popular culture ===
- He was mentioned in an episode of The Donna Reed Show, The Dick Van Dyke Show (Season 2, Episode 28 "Divorce"), Leave It to Beaver, The Patty Duke Show, Make Room for Daddy as well as in The Burns and Allen Show, the 1959 Art Buchwald book A Gift From the Boys, and the 1936 movie “Dodsworth”.
- Baruch's habit of discussing affairs on a park bench was alluded to in parody in the 1949 Bugs Bunny animated short, Rebel Rabbit.
- Francis X. Bushman played the role of Bernard Baruch in Wilson (1944).
- Larry Gates portrayed Bernard Baruch in Funny Lady (1975).
- Sam Wanamaker portrayed Bernard Baruch in Winston Churchill: The Wilderness Years (1981).

== See also ==
- Continental, Arizona, a company town founded by Baruch's Intercontinental Rubber Company

Awards and achievements
Preceded by Eleftherios Venizelos	Cover of Time magazine February 25, 1924	Succeeded by Reginald McKenna
Preceded by Tomáš Garrigue Masaryk	Cover of Time magazine March 12, 1928	Succeeded by Robert Dollar
Preceded by Benito Mussolini	Cover of Time magazine June 28, 1943	Succeeded by Aleksandr Vasilevsky
