= Waccamaw Neck =

Peninsula between the Atlantic Ocean and the Waccamaw River

Coordinates: 33°20′46″N 79°13′00″W

The Waccamaw Neck is a long narrow peninsula between the Atlantic Ocean and the Waccamaw River in Georgetown County, South Carolina. The town of Pawleys Island is located on the Waccamaw Neck, as well as the unincorporated mainland area, which includes the areas of Litchfield Beach and North Litchfield Beach. The entire area shares Zip Code 29585. The Waccamaw Neck is located south of Myrtle Beach on the Grand Strand, and just north of the historic seaport of Georgetown.

The neck is a historic area that was a major hunting and fishing ground for the prehistoric Waccamaw tribe, followed by rice plantations along the river side, with summer homes for the planters and their families on the coastal side that extended from colonial times to the beginning of the 20th century.

Today, the Waccamaw Neck is both a seaside resort community and suburb of the Myrtle Beach/Grand Strand Area.

Notable cultural locations are Brookgreen Gardens, Huntington Beach State Park, and the Belle Baruch Nature Preserve at Hobcaw Barony, a group of former plantation purchased between 1905 and 1910 as a hunting preserve by financier Bernard Baruch.

The Waccamaw Neck Bikeway is part of the East Coast Greenway, a system of trails that connects Maine to Florida.
