= Hobcaw Barony =

Historic house in South Carolina, United States

- U.S. National Register of Historic Places
- U.S. Historic district
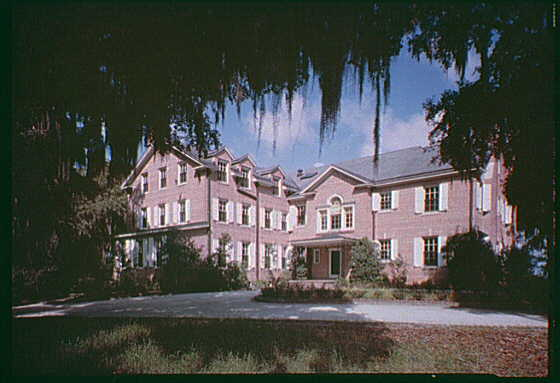
- Rear view of the Hobcaw House

- Location within South Carolina Location within the United States
- Location: Roughly bounded by U.S. Route 17, Winyah and Mud Bays and Jones Creek, near Georgetown, South Carolina
- Coordinates: 33°19′23″N 79°13′6″W
- Built: 1930 (Hobcaw House); 1936 (Bellefield Plantation)
- Architect: Lafaye and Lafaye (Hobcaw House); Murgatroyd and Ogden (Bellefield Plantation)
- Architectural style: Colonial Revival (Hobcaw House)
- MPS: Georgetown County Rice Culture MPS
- NRHP reference No.: 94001236
- Added to NRHP: November 02, 1994

Hobcaw Barony is a 16,000-acre (65 km^{2}) tract on a peninsula called Waccamaw Neck between the Winyah Bay and the Atlantic Ocean in Georgetown County, South Carolina. Much of Hobcaw Barony is south of US Highway 17. The land was purchased by the investor, philanthropist, presidential advisor, and South Carolina native Bernard M. Baruch between 1905 and 1907 for a winter hunting retreat. Later, his eldest child, Belle W. Baruch, began purchasing the property from her father beginning in 1936. By 1956, Belle owned Hobcaw Barony entirely. Upon her death in 1964, the property was transferred to the Belle W. Baruch Foundation for a nature and research preserve. The property includes more than 37 historic buildings and structures representative of the eras of both 18th & 19th century rice cultivation and 20th century winter retreats. Hobcaw Barony was named to the National Register of Historic Places on November 2, 1994.

The Belle W. Baruch Foundation and the North Inlet-Winyah Bay National Estuarine Research Reserve jointly operate the Hobcaw Barony Discovery Center and provide tours and special programs.

== History ==
In 1718, John, Lord Carteret was given a royal grant of 12,000 acres (49 km^{2}) barony on Hobcaw Point at the southern end of Waccamaw Neck. In 1766 and 1767, the tract was surveyed and sold in several parcels. These were developed into about a dozen rice plantations that contributed to Georgetown County's substantial rice production between the American Revolution and the Civil War. In 1875, Robert James Donaldson and Eliza Townley Donaldson purchased several adjoining plantations from Hardy Solomon and consolidated them into one, calling it Friendfield, where they continued to plant rice. After the Civil War, rice production decreased due to the lack of slave labor and increased production of rice in Louisiana. Bernard Baruch acquired the tract and additional land in three purchases from 1905 to 1907 to be developed as a winter hunting retreat. Although rice was no longer cultivated, the canals and embankments were retained to provide an attractive environment for waterfowl. Starting in 1935, Baruch began selling parts of Hobcaw Barony to his daughter, Belle Baruch. The first tract was 5,000 acres in the northern portion of the property. She built a house and stable complex, Bellefield Plantation, a stable cottage for her stable manager, Jean Darthez, and a small airport hangar.

Before Belle Baruch's death in 1964, she established the Belle W. Baruch Foundation to perpetuate Hobcaw Barony as an educational institute for forestry and marine biology.

== Hobcaw House complex ==
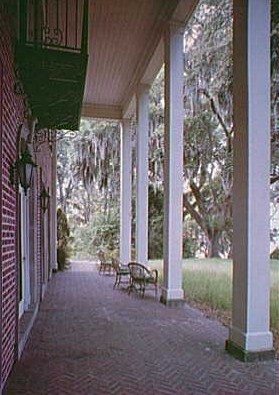

The Hobcaw House was the Baruch family winter retreat. It is about 4 mi (6.4 km) south of the main entrance and overlooks Winyah Bay. It was built in 1930 to replace the Donaldson House, which burned in December 1929. The red brick house was designed by the Columbia, South Carolina, architects Lafaye and Lafaye.

Barnard Baruch entertained many friends at Hobcaw Barony. Winston Churchill and his daughter, Diana, visited in 1932. President Roosevelt took a month-long working vacation in Spring 1944 during World War II. Ralph Pulitzer, Walter Huston, Generals George C. Marshall, Omar Bradley and Mark Clark, and Senators Robert A. Taft and Harry F. Byrd were a few of his notable guests.

== Bellefield Plantation complex ==
The Bellefield House Complex is about 1.25 mi (2.0 km) south of the main entrance. The house was designed by Murgatroyd and Ogden of New York and built in 1936 with Lafaye and Lafaye of Columbia providing specifications. It is a two-story frame house with four single-story wings and a brick service wing to the rear. The house has a gabled roof. The house is built on a raised terrace with live oaks and pines. The chief landscape architect was Umberto Innocenti of New York and New Jersey.

The Bellefield Garage, also design by Murgatroyd and Ogden, had parking for four vehicles, a laundry, and two rooms for servants. The Bellefield Stable, which was considered essential by Belle, was designed by John D. W. Churchill of New York and built in 1937. The kennel for hunting dogs and the fowl coop are nearby.

== Slave settlements ==
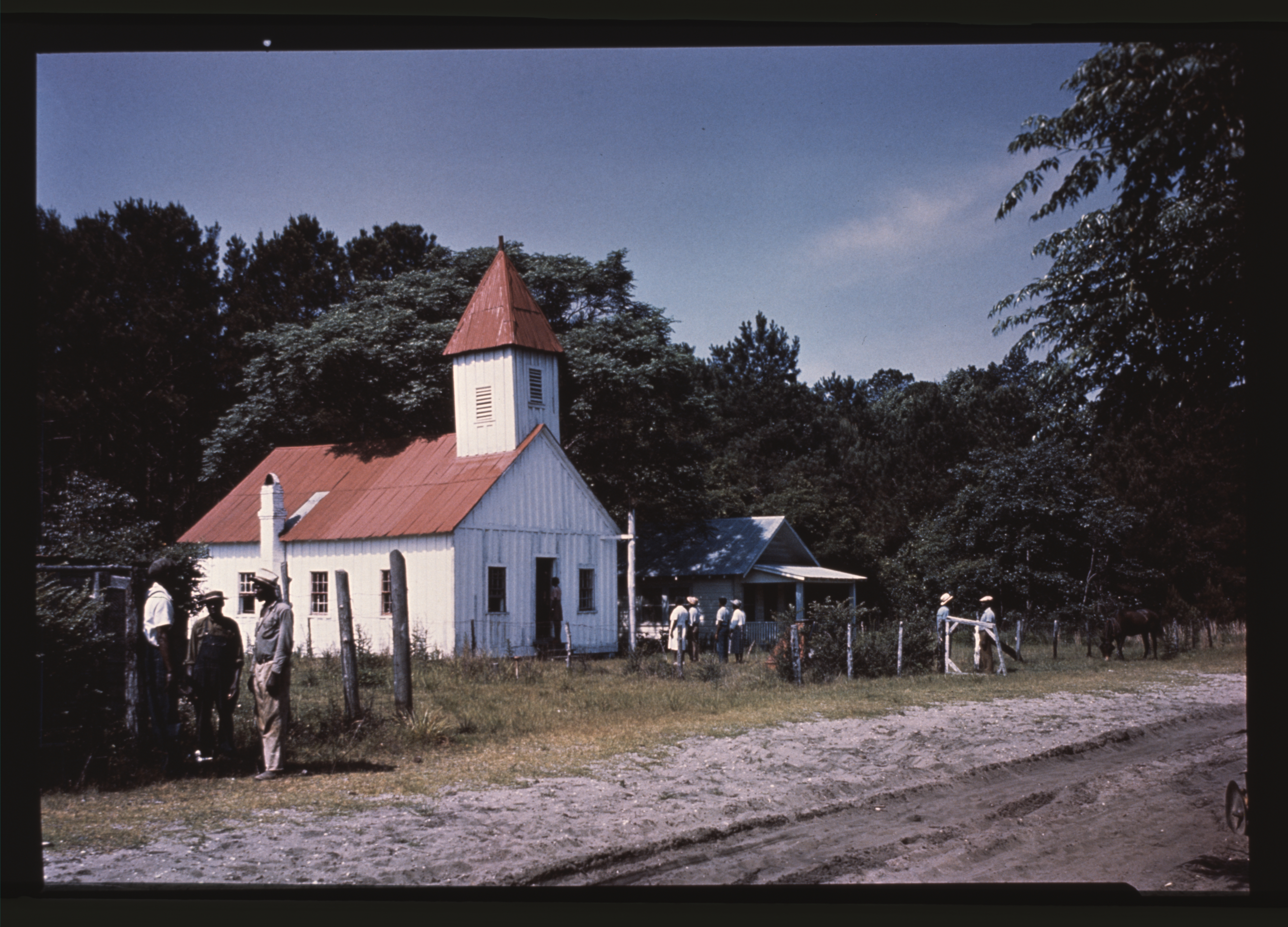
Friendfield Church

A number of old slave settlements are extant. Friendfield Village, between Kings Highway and Hobcaw Road, has five unused houses, a church and a dispensary, as well as several antebellum slave cabins. Two others were remodeled in 1905. The Friendfield Church, which was built in 1890, is a rectangular building with board-and-batten siding, a gabled metal roof, and a pyramidal spire. Two additional cottages in Friendfield Village were built around 1935.

Barnyard Village is also on the old Friendfield Plantation. There is one antebellum cabin that was remodeled in the period from 1890 to 1905. Two residences for employees of Hobcaw Barony were constructed in 1925.

Strawberry Village is 0.5 mi (0.8 km) north of the Hobcaw Barony Complex in an isolated area. The Strawberry School was built in 1915 for the African-American children at Hobcaw Barony and was expanded in 1935.

== Rice fields ==
The rice fields played a major role in the 19th century life of the area. Many of the canals, banks, and trunks have been maintained on Hobcaw Barony. About 325 acres (1.3 km^{2}) of the Alderley and Oryzantia, 300 acres (1.2 km^{2}) of the Youngfield and Bellefield, 50 acres (0.2 km^{2}) of the Strawberry Hill, and 800 acres (3.2 km^{2}) of the Michaux and Calais Plantations remain. About 260 acres (1.1 km^{2}) of the Marrietta, Friendfield, and Strawberry Hill Plantations have been altered.

== Other ==
Over 8,000 acres (32 km^{2}) of forests remain consisting of hardwood species, loblolly and longleaf pine, and cypress/tupelo swamps. Although the majority has not been timbered since Baruch's purchase, some harvesting was done in 1944 and 1945 to support war mobilization. Portions of the King's Highway remain as a dirt road from near Highway 17 to Frasers Point on Winyah Bay south of the Hobcaw House Complex.

A hangar at Bellefield Airport was constructed for two planes used by Belle Baruch. The field was leased to the US Army in 1942 for the war effort.

Portions of the Friendfield Plantation Rice Mill remain. The brick building with chimney and a winnowing house were probably built in the 1870s.

There are old cemeteries including the Calais Cemetery at Frasers Point, the Fairfield or Donaldson Cemetery, the Alderly Cemetery, and the Marietta/Bellefield Cemetery.

As of 2013 salt marshes have slightly expanded at the expense of forest due to rising sea levels as encroaching sea water kills trees.

== Art theft ==
In 2003, former curator Sammy McIntosh left Bellefield House and moved to Kingstree because his contract had not been renewed for cause. On his last night in the house, a number of pieces of art mysteriously disappeared. About three weeks later, Williamsburg County deputies recovered the stolen print "Sporting Life" by John Leache, whose estimated value was about $12,000, along with other items belonging to the foundation from McIntosh's house. He was charged with four counts of breach of trust with fraudulent intent, one count of receiving stolen goods and one count of filing a false police report, according to court records. He was sentenced to three years probation after pleading no contest. However, the most important pieces of art, a Sir Alfred Munnings portrait of Belle Baruch and her horse Souriant and two studies along with seven John James Audubon prints remained missing.

The Baruch Foundation offered a $25,000 reward for information about the whereabouts of the missing artwork. There was little activity though until an "Antiques Roadshow" episode aired in February 2013. They hoped this would generate some leads, but unfortunately no real leads were found and the trail went dead until 2016.

In 2016, John and Patty Ivy of Ivy Auctions in Laurens, SC, were hired to sell the contents of an estate in the area. Upon receiving the art for cataloging in the sale, the Ivys recognized the artist nameand contacted their colleague, Converse College associate professor Frazer Pajak, to help identify and catalog the work. Pajak, who coincidentally had done some work for the Baruch foundation for architectural sketches of Hobcaw, knew the works, including the Munnings portrait and two preliminary sketches by Munnings for the portrait, immediately. The Ivys contacted George Chastain, director of the Belle Baruch Foundation in Georgetown, SC, and the FBI in order to return the art to the rightful owners.

The paintings have been returned to The Baruch Foundation. Six paintings of Hobcaw Barony by artist Louis Aston Knight remain at large as of 2016.

== Modern facilities ==
Modern non-contributing properties are on Hobcaw Barony. The University of South Carolina operates the Baruch Institute for Marine & Coastal Sciences. and Clemson University has its Belle W. Baruch Institute of Coastal Ecology & Forest Science
