= Asser Levy Recreation Center =

Recreation center in Manhattan, New York

- Asser Levy Public Baths
- U.S. National Register of Historic Places
- New York State Register of Historic Places
- New York City Landmark
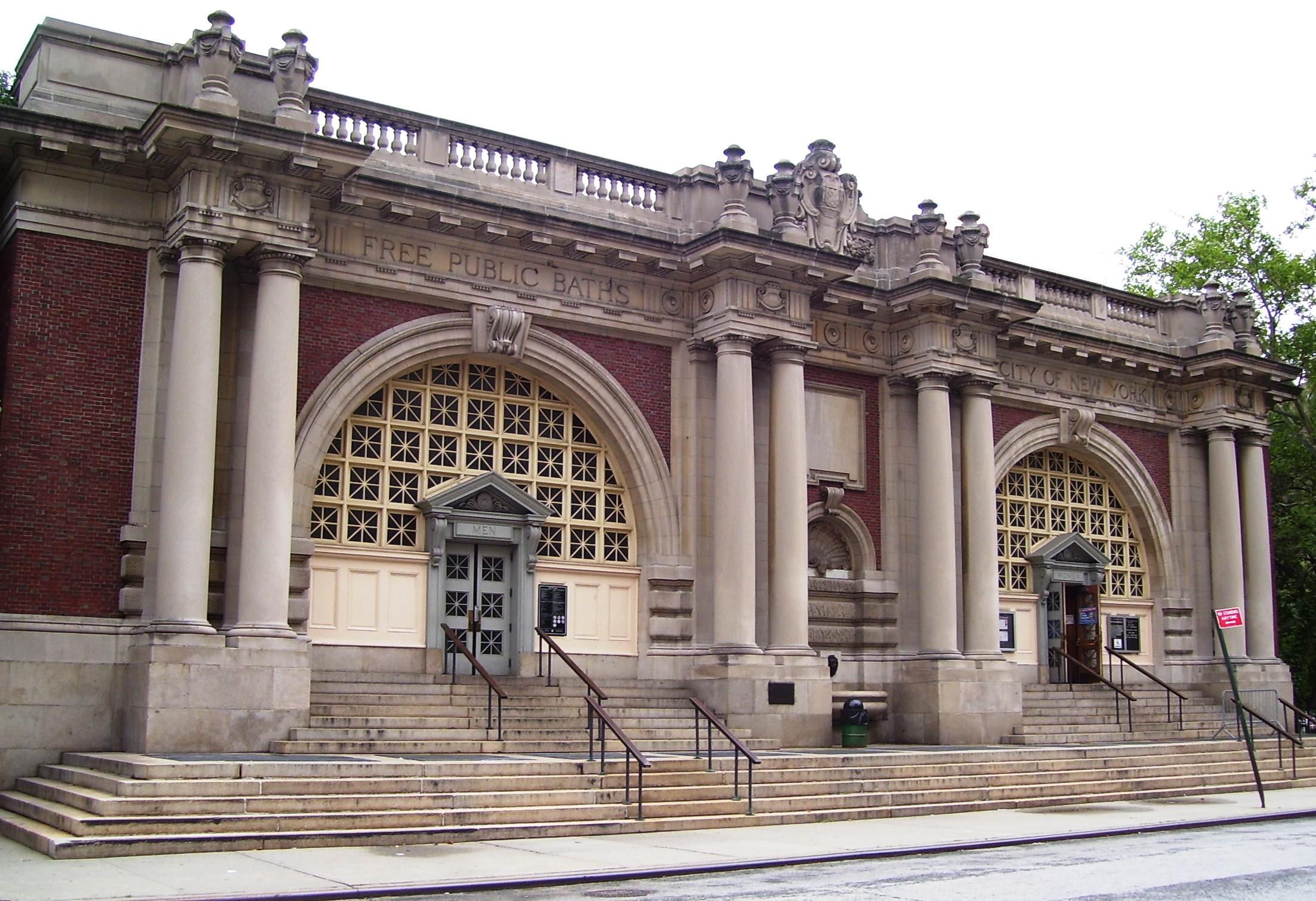
- The main entrance seen in 2010
- Location: Asser Levy Place and East 23rd Street; Manhattan, New York City
- Coordinates: 40°44′10″N 73°58′32″W
- Built: 1905–1908
- Architect: Brunner & Aiken
- Architectural style: Roman Revival
- NRHP reference No.: 80002709
- NYSRHP No.: 06101.001806
- NYCL No.: 0842

Significant dates
- Added to NRHP: April 23, 1980
- Designated NYSRHP: June 23, 1980
- Designated NYCL: March 19, 1974

The Asser Levy Recreation Center is a recreational facility in the Kips Bay neighborhood of Manhattan in New York City, composed of the Asser Levy Public Baths and Asser Levy Playground. It is bounded by East 23rd Street to the south, East 25th Street to the north, and FDR Drive to the east. Along with the former Asser Levy Place to the west, it was named after Asser Levy, one of New York City's first Jewish citizens and a strong and influential advocate for civil liberties.

The Asser Levy Public Baths, the recreation center's main building, was designed by Arnold W. Brunner and Martin Aiken. Its main entrance on Asser Levy Place consists of two large arches flanked by pairs of columns. Inside are recreational rooms, a swimming pool, and lockers. It originally had separate waiting rooms and showers for men and women, though the waiting rooms were subsequently combined and the showers relocated. Outdoor recreational facilities, including additional swimming pools and the playground, surround the bathhouse.

The bathhouse was built in 1905–1908 to alleviate sanitary problems in the city and was transferred to the New York City Department of Parks and Recreation (NYC Parks) in 1938. Originally known as the East 23rd Street Baths, it was renamed for Levy in the mid-20th century. The building was designated a New York City landmark in 1974 and added to the National Register of Historic Places in 1980. It was restored by NYC Parks in 1988–1990, and the other recreational facilities were built in 1993 and 2014.

== Description ==
The Asser Levy Recreation Center is in the Kips Bay neighborhood of Manhattan in New York City, on Manhattan's East Side. The 2.44-acre (0.99 ha) site is bounded by 23rd Street to the south, the VA Medical Center to the west, 25th Street to the north, and the FDR Drive and the East River to the east. The western side was formerly bounded by Asser Levy Place (originally Avenue A), a street between First Avenue to the west and FDR Drive in the east. Asser Levy Place was removed in 2013.

The Asser Levy Public Baths, at the southwestern corner of the recreation center, is roughly cross-shaped in plan and measures roughly 163 by 140 feet (50 by 43 m). Built in the first decade of the 20th century, (Note: The New York City Landmarks Preservation Commission cites the date of construction as between 1904 and 1906. However, contemporary news articles and journals show that the bathhouse's general contract was not awarded until 1905 and that an official opening did not occur until 1908.) it was designed by Arnold W. Brunner and Martin Aiken of the shortlived partnership Brunner & Aiken, although Aiken may have been more involved than Brunner. (Note: Architectural historian Robert A. M. Stern writes that the Eleventh Street Baths (now the Bathhouse Studios) in the East Village of Manhattan, credited solely to Brunner, is more representative of his work.) The Roman Revival design was inspired by Roman baths and the City Beautiful movement. The building was particularly ornate, even in comparison to other New York City bathhouses built in the first decade of the 20th century. Other bathhouses were designed to be "easily recognizable", but lacked "all outward display of lavishness [...] as it would only keep the poor people away".

=== Bathhouse facade ===
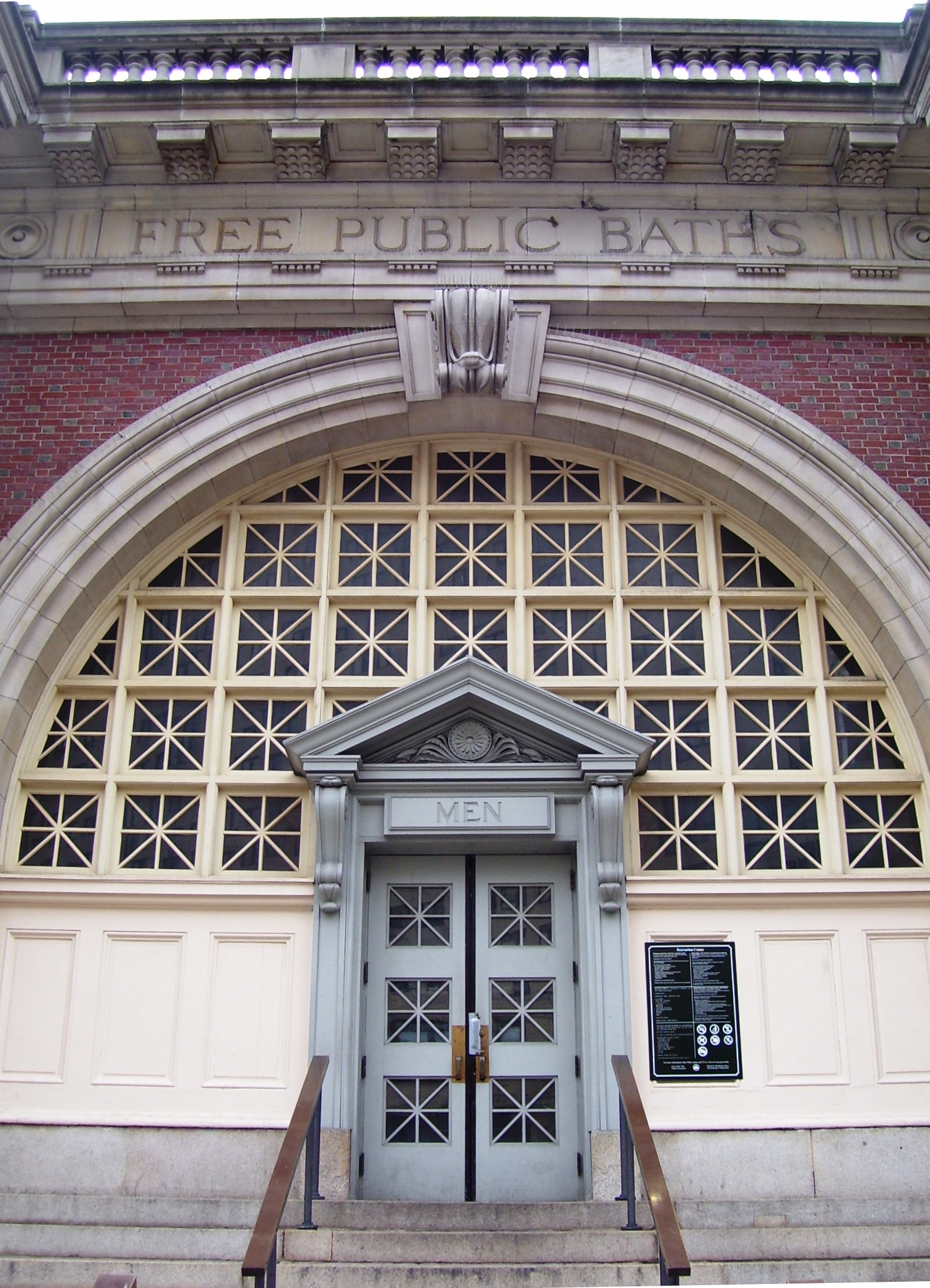
One of the formerly gender-segregated entrances to the bathhouse

The bathhouse's facade is made largely of red Harvard brick with a base made of Indiana limestone. The main entrance faces west onto the former path of Asser Levy Place, now part of the recreation center's outdoor facilities. It contains two arches, each flanked by a pair of round columns, that were originally separate entrances for men (northern doors) and women (southern doors). Within each arch is a pair of small doors, flanked by scrolled brackets supporting triangular pediments atop each doorway. The remainders of either archway are infilled with a grid of windows containing diagonal muntins, while the archways themselves contain scrolled keystones at their tops. Architectural historian Robert A. M. Stern wrote that the main arches "were more like portals to a great amphitheatre than frames around doors to a hygienic facility".

Between the archways, there is a decorative niche with a fountain, which is topped by the shield of New York City. The top of the facade above the main entrance contains a frieze, a cornice supported by modillions, and an architrave. The frieze contains the words free public baths above the northern arch and city of new york above the southern arch. There are also decorative urns at the top of the building. These features are made of terracotta created by the Atlantic Terra Cotta Company.

There are round window openings on the sides of the main entrance wing, as well as in the northern and southern wings, where the showers and dressing rooms were. The eastern wing contains a similar, but more simple, design. These wings also contain cornices, which are supported by dentils. There is a copper gable roof atop the bathhouse, with an iron skylight overlooking the pool at the center of the building.

=== Indoor facilities ===
Inside the Public Baths building are the indoor facilities of the recreation center. Because of the composition of the underlying soil, the structure was built on pilings and lacks a basement. As originally arranged, the men's spaces were in the north end of the building, while the women's spaces were in the south end. There were waiting rooms for the different genders just inside each entrance, with each of these rooms measuring 25 by 50 feet (7.6 by 15.2 m). The formerly separate men's and women's waiting rooms have been combined into a single space with a double-height vaulted ceiling. The space serves as the modern lobby and contains tables for table tennis and pool.

Just east of the waiting room, in the center of the bathhouse, is a triple-height natatorium room with an enclosed rectangular swimming pool extending from west to east. According to NYC Parks, the pool measures 66 by 26 feet (20.1 by 7.9 m). (Note: Various media sources gave slightly different measurements for the pool. The New-York Tribune cited the pool as measuring 68 by 32 feet (20.7 by 9.8 m); The New York Times gave a measurement of 68 by 25 feet (20.7 by 7.6 m); and the Daily News gave a measurement of 64 by 24 feet (19.5 by 7.3 m).) It has a minimum depth of 4 feet (1.2 m) at the western end and a maximum depth of 7 feet (2.1 m) at the eastern end. The pool contains a bronze lion's head fountain at its shallow end and is surrounded by a gutter. The surrounding deck, as well as the lowest 10 feet (3.0 m) of the perimeter walls, are clad in ceramic tiles. There is a balcony on the second floor of the natatorium, overlooking the pool, with smooth brick walls. The skylight above the natatorium is supported by large steel girders that rest on stone modillions along each of the western and eastern walls. A rear entrance allowed spectators to observe activities in the pool.

Leading east from each waiting room, flanking the pool, were the shower rooms, which occupy the northern and southern wings of the building. All bathers were required to use the showers before entering the swimming pool. The structure contained more than 150 shower stalls when it opened. (Note: Sources give conflicting figures of 152, 154, 155, or 156 showers. The New York Times reported that there were 78 showers per gender, or 156 total.) The men's shower room measured 42 by 66 feet (13 by 20 m) while the women's shower room measured 25 by 49 feet (7.6 by 14.9 m). The shower rooms were also equipped with five tub baths at their opening, to be used by "invalids" or by mothers with small children. The shower rooms contained floors, walls, and changing booths made of marble. The shower rooms also had separate exits to Avenue A, which allowed bathers to exit without having to return to the waiting room. After a 1990 renovation, a multipurpose room, a media lab, and a fitness room were added to the space.

The toilets were at the eastern end of each shower room. A small annex extends east of the natatorium. It originally contained a boiler room on the north and an engine room on the south. There were overhead storage rooms to store the coal for the boiler room.

=== Outdoor facilities ===
Southeast of the bathhouse building is an outdoor swimming area with a general swimming pool and a wading pool. According to NYC Parks, the outdoor pool measures 120 feet (37 m) long, 45 feet (14 m) wide, and 4 feet (1.2 m) deep. (Note: The New York Times in 1974 reported the outdoor pool as being 150 feet (46 m) long and 50 feet (15 m) wide, while the Daily News in 1999 reported it as being 126 feet (38 m) long and 50 feet wide.) Next to the general pool is a wading pool measuring 41.67 by 25 feet (12.70 by 7.62 m), with a depth of 1.5 feet (0.46 m). At one point, there was also a diving pool measuring 10 feet (3.0 m) deep. The pools are separated from the street by a fence.

The recreation center also has outdoor exercise equipment, handball courts, basketball courts, an artificial turf field, a running track, and a sprinkler. The basketball court and playground are along the FDR Drive, just north of the bathhouse. There are four handball courts at 25th Street and the FDR Drive, in the recreation center's northeastern corner. Fitness equipment, a soccer field, and a running track are in the western section of the Asser Levy Recreation Center, on the former path of Asser Levy Place. Lighting, benches, and water fountains were also installed on the street's former site.

== History ==
=== Planning and construction ===
The baths were an important part of the drive to alleviate sanitary problems in the city. Many New Yorkers, especially immigrants living in overcrowded tenements, had no place to bathe. An 1896 survey found that there was one bathtub on the Lower East Side for every 79 families. Progressive social reformers pushed for the construction of public bathhouses modeled on those of ancient Rome. In 1895, the state passed a law requiring that localities build public baths. At the time, floating baths still existed along the Hudson and East rivers, but these were widely considered unsanitary. New York City did not build its first bathhouse, the Rivington Street municipal bath, until 1901. There were twenty-three bathhouses across New York City by 1912, including what became the Asser Levy Public Baths.

In 1903, the city's Department of Docks and Ferries released land for a new bathhouse at East 23rd Street and Avenue A. Aiken and Brunner were hired as the architects. The building plans, completed in October 1904, were projected to cost $250,000. A construction contract had been issued by early 1905, and contractor Luke A. Burke & Sons started constructing the bathhouse that June. The original plans called for two separate indoor pools, one each for men and women, but these plans were changed so that both genders shared one pool. The pool at the East 23rd Street Bathhouse, along with another at the West 60th Street Bathhouse (now the Gertrude Ederle Recreation Center), was included to attract greater patronage of the bathhouse. The bathhouse opened on January 20, 1908, with a ceremony led by borough president John F. Ahearn. Competitive swimmers such as Charles Daniels competed at the bathhouse's indoor pool during the opening ceremony. Men and women were allowed to use the pool on alternating days of the week.

=== Modifications and renovations ===
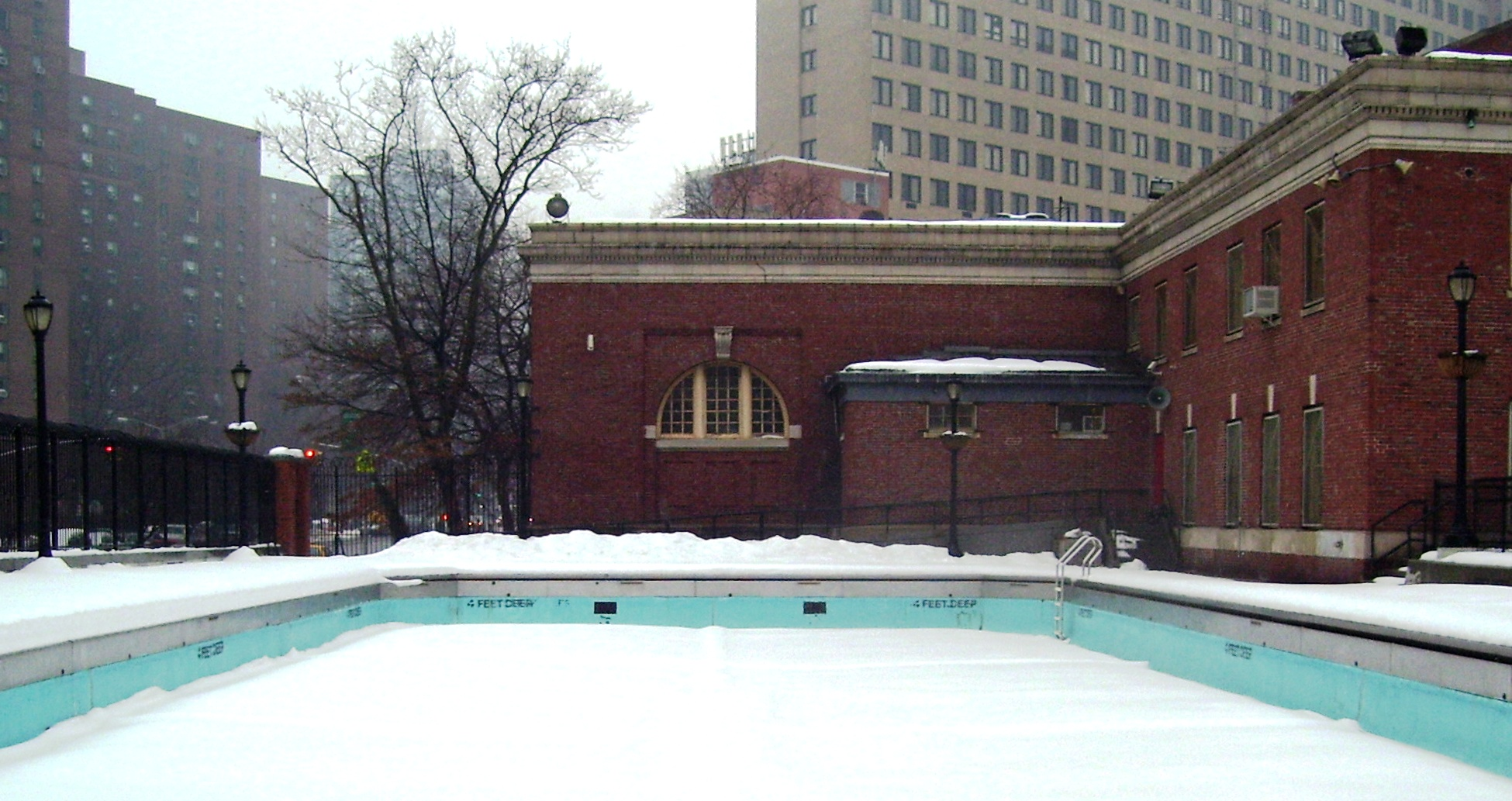
Outdoor pool

The outdoor pool southeast of the bathhouse, as well as the adjacent diving pool, opened in 1936. The 23rd Street Bathhouse was transferred to the New York City Department of Parks and Recreation (NYC Parks) in 1938. Prior to that, it was operated by the borough of Manhattan.

After the construction of Stuyvesant Town–Peter Cooper Village to the south, in the 1940s and 1950s, the two-block section of Avenue A outside the East 23rd Street Bathhouse was cut off from the rest of the avenue. The segment outside the bathhouse was renamed in 1954 after Asser Levy, one of the first Jewish citizens of New York City and a strong and influential advocate for civil liberties. The bathhouse also came to be known for Asser Levy during the mid-20th century. Albert H. Blumenthal, the liberal candidate for the 1973 New York City mayoral election, visited the Asser Levy Bathhouse to mark the start of the "official" campaign season for that election, jumping into the pool there. The New York City Landmarks Preservation Commission designated the Asser Levy Public Baths as a New York City landmark on March 19, 1974, and the building was added to the National Register of Historic Places on April 23, 1980.

By late 1978, the bathhouse's indoor pool was not used or heated during the winter, although a small number of staff remained in the bathhouse. After the indoor pool's boiler ruptured in March 1979, the indoor pool was closed indefinitely, while the outdoor pool remained operational. During the 1980s, Manhattan Community Board 6 asked the city to provide $5–6 million for a renovation. After the funds were finally provided in the city's fiscal year 1988 budget, work on an $8 million renovation started on November 30, 1988. The bathhouse reopened on June 28, 1990. A 1.7-acre (0.69 ha) accessible playground opened adjacent to the recreation building in October 1993, after six years of planning. At the time, it was Manhattan's first playground that was fully accessible for disabled children. In 1995, the city government found that lead chips from the FDR Drive viaduct, to the east, were blowing into the Asser Levy Recreation Center's outdoor pool area, resulting in extremely high lead levels.

By the beginning of the 21st century, the Asser Levy Recreation Center was one of the city's last remaining public bathhouses. In 2011, the New York City government agreed to convert Asser Levy Place into an extension of the Asser Levy Recreation Center. The agreement was made as part of a land swap. The city had sold the western end of the Robert Moses Playground, at 42nd Street and FDR Drive, to the United Nations so that the UN could build an office tower on the Robert Moses Playground's site. Asser Levy Place was permanently closed in 2013, and work on the park extension began that November. The expansion of the Asser Levy Playground was completed in October 2014, although the official opening of the playground expansion did not occur until the following February. Part of the playground was temporarily closed in December 2020 as part of the East Side Coastal Resiliency project, a series of flood barriers and infrastructure upgrades along the East River coast. The playground was completed in May 2022, and a new flood wall at the playground was finished in late 2024 as part of the East Side Coastal Resiliency project.

== See also ==
- National Register of Historic Places listings in Manhattan from 14th to 59th Streets
- List of New York City Designated Landmarks in Manhattan from 14th to 59th Streets
