= Avenue A (Manhattan) =

Avenue in Manhattan, New York

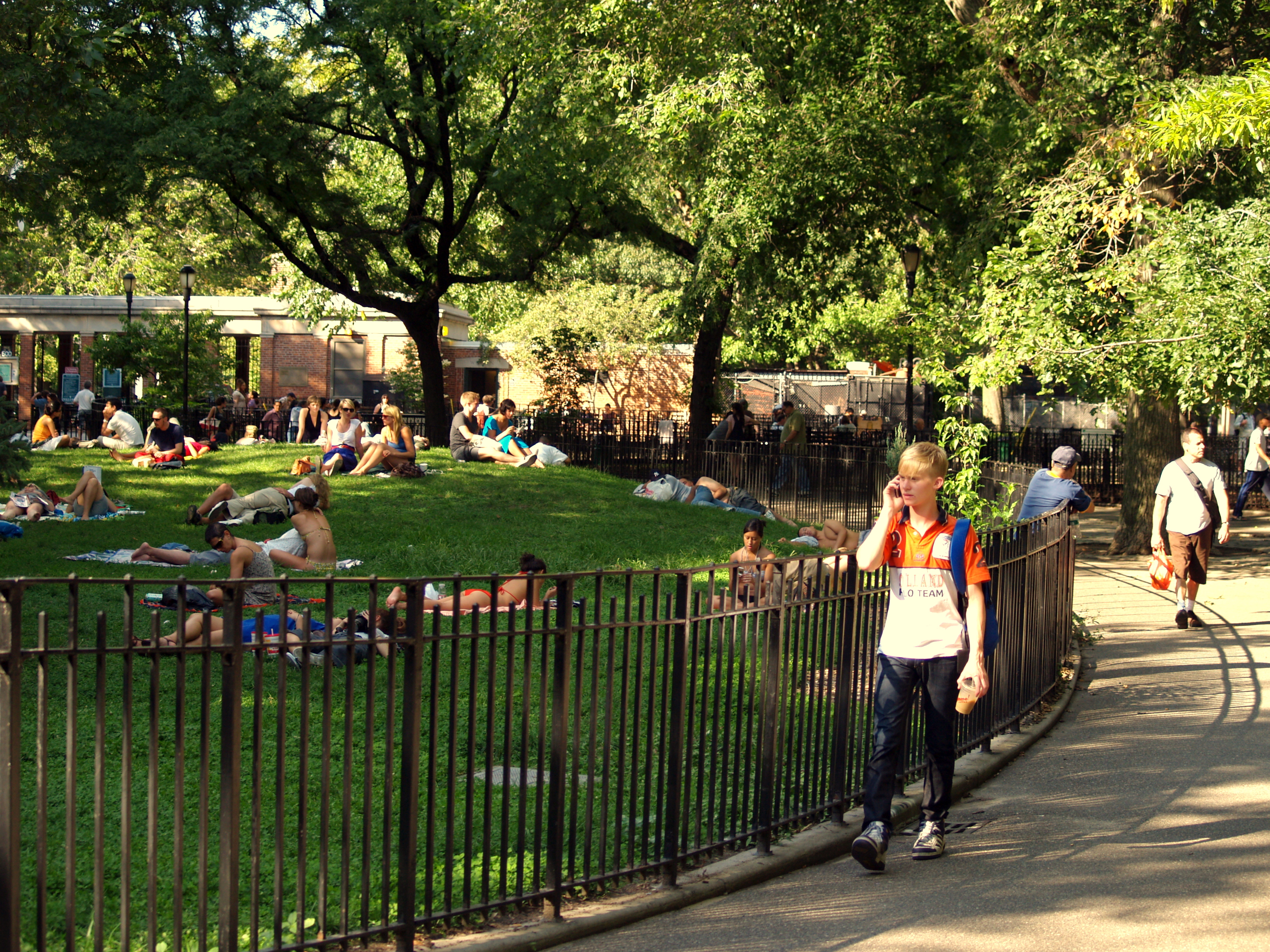
- Tompkins Square Park lines Avenue A between East Seventh Street and East 10th Street.
- Owner: City of New York
- Maintained by: NYCDOT
- Length: 1.1 mi (1.8 km)
- Location: Manhattan, New York City
- South end: Houston
- North end: 14th Street
- East: Avenue B
- West: First Avenue

Construction
- Commissioned: March 1811

Avenue A is a north–south avenue located in Manhattan, New York City, east of First Avenue and west of Avenue B. It runs from Houston Street to 14th Street, where it continues into a loop road in Stuyvesant Town, connecting to Avenue B. Below Houston Street, Avenue A continues as Essex Street.

It is considered to be the western border of Alphabet City in the East Village. It is also the western border of Tompkins Square Park.

== Sections ==
Under the Commissioners' Plan of 1811 that established the Manhattan street grid, the avenues would begin with First Avenue on the east side and run through Twelfth Avenue in the west. East of First Avenue the plan provided four additional lettered avenues running from Avenue A eastward to Avenue D wherever they could be fitted.

While First Avenue was the easternmost avenue in most of Manhattan, several discontinuous sections were designated as Avenue A north of present-day Alphabet City.

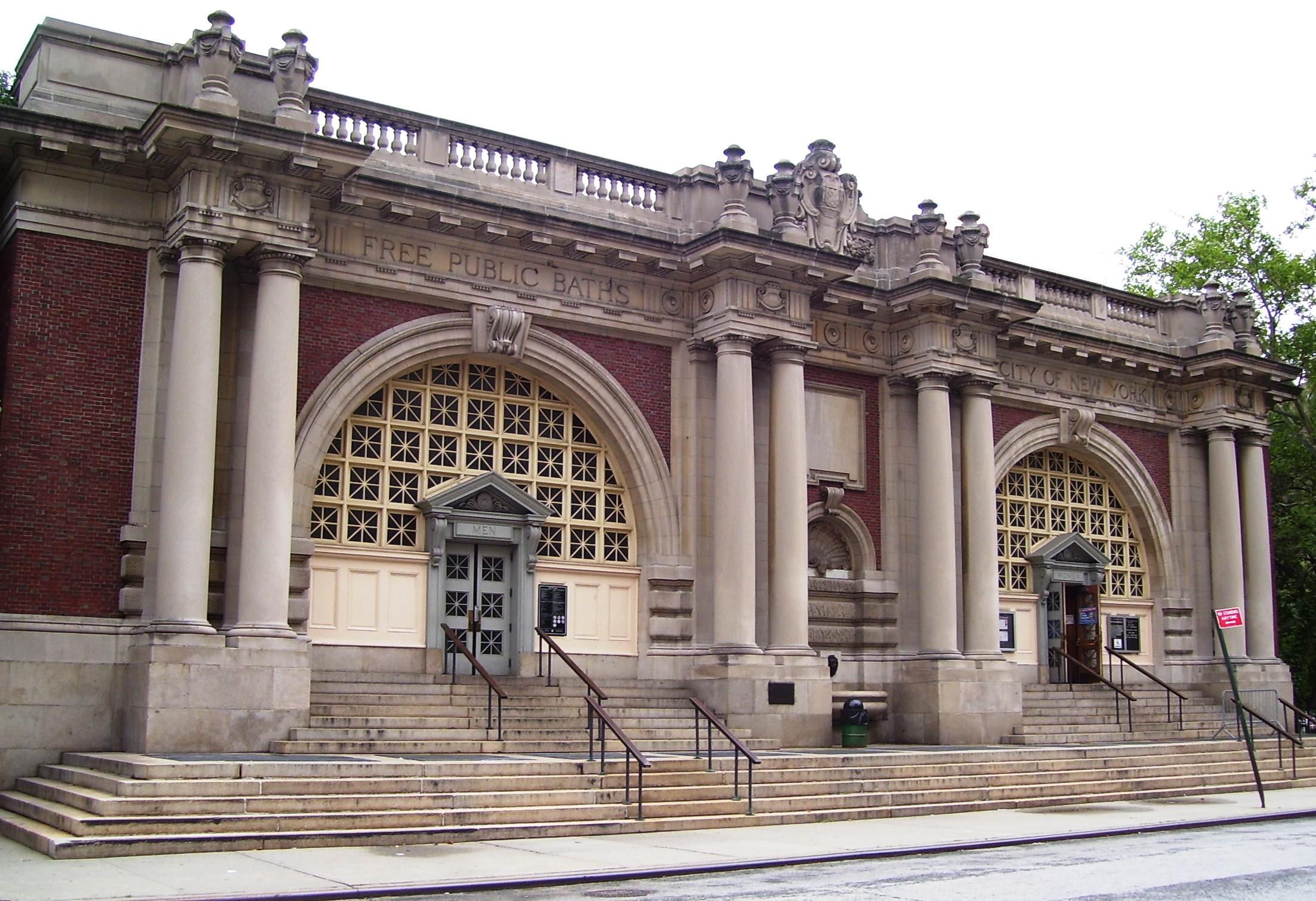
Asser Levy Place entrance to the Asser Levy Public Baths

=== Asser Levy Place ===
As late as 1943, Avenue A went as far north as 25th Street. In 1947, with the construction of Stuyvesant Town and Peter Cooper Village, a short section of Avenue A from 23rd to 25th Streets in Kips Bay, Manhattan, was cut off from the existing section below 14th Street. The two-block section was renamed in 1954 after Asser Levy, one of the first Jewish citizens of New York City, and a strong and influential advocate for civil liberties. The eastern side of Asser Levy Place contains the Asser Levy Recreation Center, which includes the Asser Levy Public Baths, built in 1905–08.

Asser Levy Place closed in October 2013 to become part of the Recreation Center The park now contains concrete Ping-Pong tables, a track and field, exercise equipment, and painted children's games such as hopscotch. It is being built by New York City Department of Parks and Recreation to replace the western end of the Robert Moses Playground at 42nd Street and FDR Drive being sold to the United Nations, in preparation for a future East River Greenway phase on the FDR Drive, underneath the United Nations headquarters between East 38th and 60th Streets.

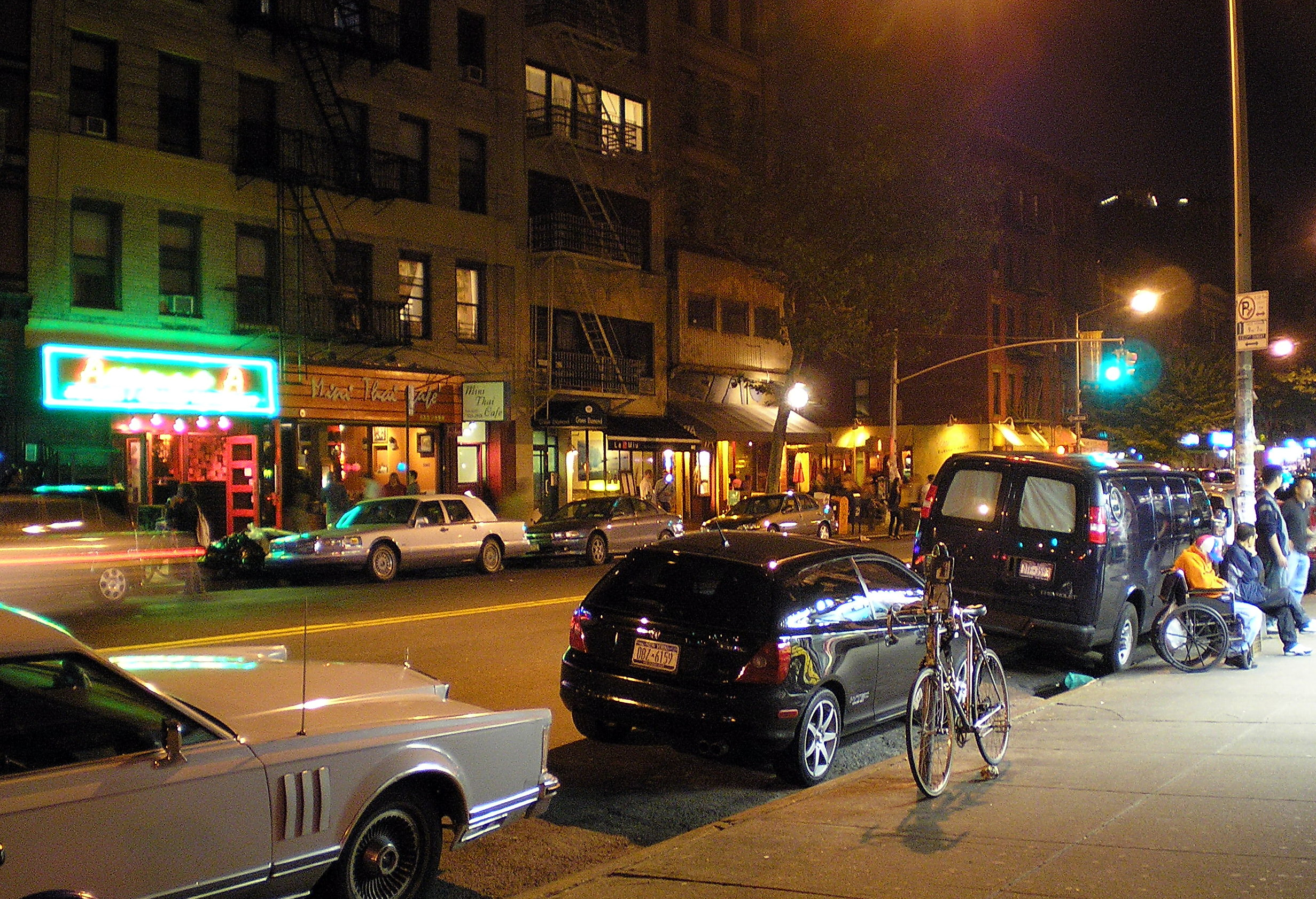
Avenue A and East 7th Street, midnight

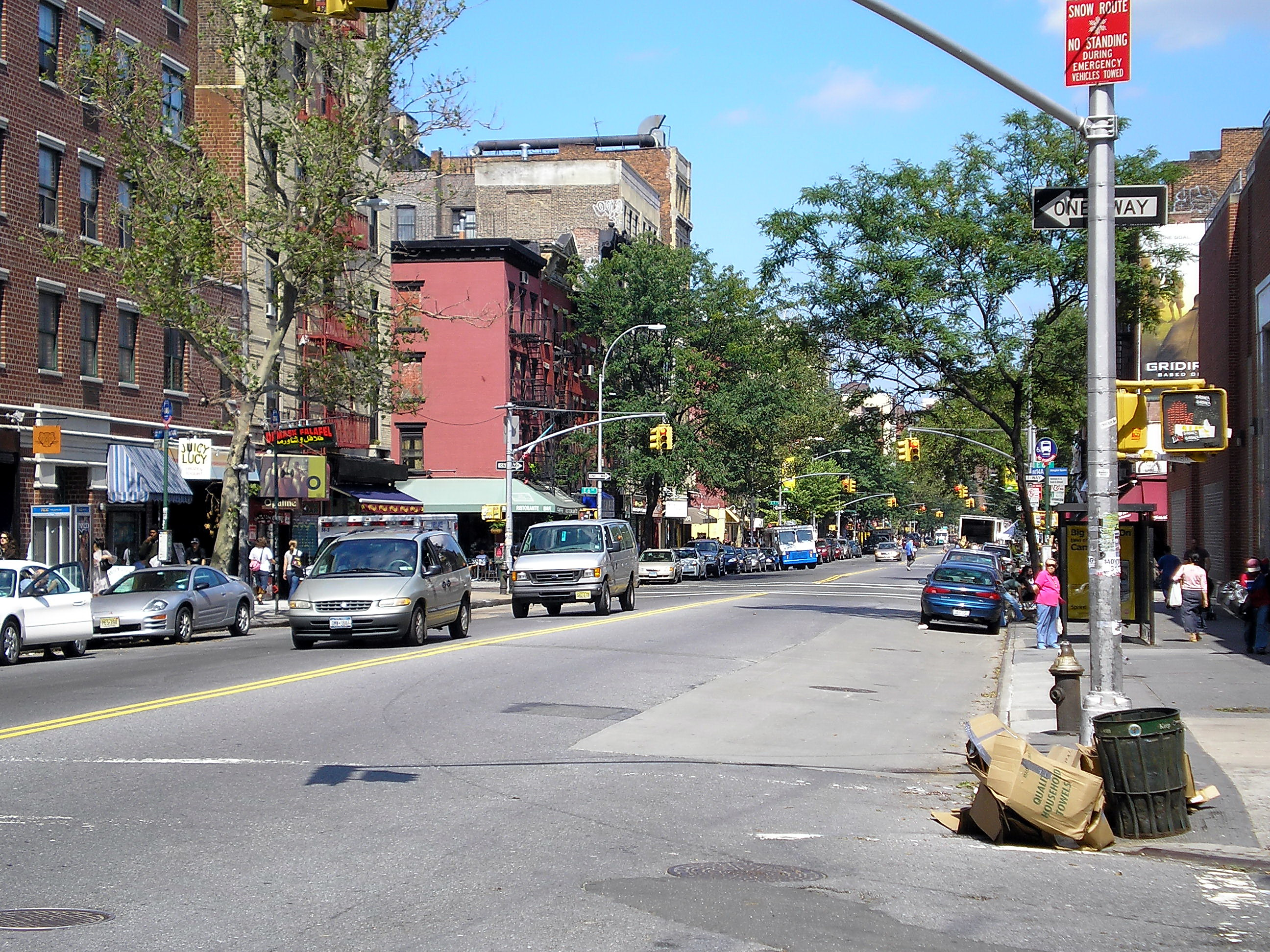
Avenue A from East 5th Street, noon

=== Beekman Place ===
Beekman Place, located at the headquarters of the United Nations, runs as a short street between Mitchell Place/49th Street and 51st Street. Though not part of the original Avenue A in the 1811 plan, it is named after the Beekman family (members of whom include Wilhelmus Beekman, whose namesakes also include downtown's Beekman Street and William Street), who were influential in New York City's development.

=== Sutton Place and York Avenue ===
Sutton Place was also formerly designated as Avenue A; in its original length it ran between East 53rd and 92nd Streets. Effingham B. Sutton constructed a group of brownstones in 1875 between 57th and 58th Streets, and is said to have lent the street his name, though the earliest source found by The New York Times dates back to 1883. The New York City Board of Aldermen approved a petition to change the name from "Avenue A" to "Sutton Place", covering the blocks between 57th and 60th Streets.

In 1928, a one-block section of Sutton Place north of East 59th Street, and all of Avenue A north of that point, was renamed York Avenue in honor of World War One US Army Sergeant Alvin York, who won the Medal of Honor for an attack in the Meuse-Argonne Offensive on October 8, 1918. This section is the only former section of Avenue A to still use the Avenue A address system (as it only has four-digit building numbers).

=== Pleasant Avenue ===
The northernmost section of Avenue A, stretching between East 114th and 120th Streets in East Harlem, was renamed Pleasant Avenue in 1879. The addresses on Pleasant Avenue are not continuous with those on Avenue A (which would be in the 2000-series if they were continuous).

== Transportation ==
The M14A SBS bus travels Avenue A from East 11th to Houston Streets (which becomes Essex Street), then east along Grand Street to the FDR Drive on the East River coastline. The M8 also runs on Avenue A south of East 10th Street to East 9th Street (westbound) or from St. Marks Place (eastbound).

== See also ==
On the same position on the Manhattan street grid:

- Essex Street, Lower East Side

Other lettered avenues in Alphabet City, Manhattan:

- Avenue B (Manhattan)
- Avenue C (Manhattan)
- Avenue D (Manhattan)
