= Arnold W. Brunner =

American architect

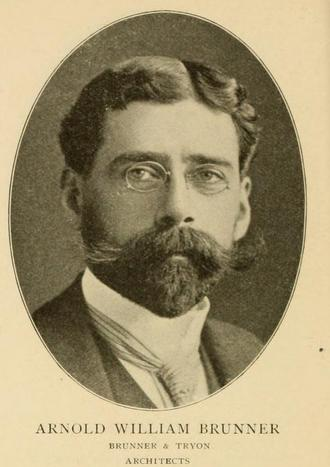
- Born: September 25, 1857; New York City, U.S.
- Died: February 14, 1925 (aged 67); New York City, U.S.
- Education: Massachusetts Institute of Technology
- Occupation: Architect

Arnold William Brunner (September 25, 1857 – February 14, 1925) was an American architect who was born and died in New York City. Brunner was educated in New York and in Manchester, England. He attended the Massachusetts Institute of Technology, where he studied under William R. Ware. Early in his career, he worked in the architectural office of George B. Post. He was a Fellow of the American Institute of Architects after 1892 and was appointed by Theodore Roosevelt to the United States Commission of Fine Arts in Washington, D.C. He was a member of the New York Fine Arts Commission, the American Civic Association, The Century Association, The Engineer's Club, The Players, the Cosmos Club in Washington D.C., the National Institute of Arts and Letters, The Union Club of Cleveland, and several other organizations. In 1910, he was elected to the National Academy of Design as an Associate member, and became a full member in 1916. Brunner was also known as a city planner, and made significant contributions to the city plans of Cleveland, Ohio, Rochester, New York, Baltimore, Maryland, Denver, Colorado, Trenton, New Jersey, and Albany, New York. Brunner was, for a short time, partnered with Thomas Tryon as the firm Brunner & Tryon.

== Notable works ==
Brunner designed several notable buildings including, with Tryon, the 1897 Congregation Shearith Israel, on Central Park West, New York, to house the United States' oldest Jewish congregation, founded in 1654. No attempt was made to convey an "eastern" vocabulary, as was often being done for other Jewish congregations: Brunner and Tryon provided a forthright Roman Baroque temple with a projecting three-bay center that contrasts with the windowless ashlar masonry flanking it and contains a recessed loggia entrance under three large arch-headed windows, articulated by a colossal order of Corinthian columns surmounted by a pediment over a paneled attic frieze.

Another synagogue designed by Brunner was Temple Israel at 201 Lenox Avenue, at 120th Street, in 1907. The limestone building was not designed in the typical Moorish Revival style of other synagogues of the time; Brunner argued that "synagogues have no traditional lines of architectural expression". According to David W. Dunlap, the building "looks like a Roman temple until you notice the Stars of David in the column capitals, fanlights, and spandrel panels", and "may rank as the single best Neoclassical synagogue in Manhattan".

Students' Hall at Barnard College was built in 1916 and listed on the National Register of Historic Places in 2003.

Brunner also designed improvements at the Pennsylvania State Capitol in Harrisburg, the Stadium of the College of the City of New York (also known as Lewisohn Stadium), and the Asser Levy Public Baths and Mount Sinai Hospital in New York City. Brunner also designed the U.S. Post Office, Custom House and Courthouse (1910) in the Group Plan conceived by Daniel Burnham, John Carrère, and Brunner in 1903 to create a new urbanistic center for Cleveland, Ohio, which was a rare realisation of a "City Beautiful" plan. Other work in Ohio included the Monumental Bridge in Toledo and Denison University in Granville, Ohio. He also won the competition for the design of the U.S. State Department Building in Washington D.C.

Brunner designed a bascule bridge over the Maumee River in Toledo, Ohio, that remains in use today, as the Martin Luther King Bridge. Brunner's design introduced an innovative design for keeping streetcar power lines taut, yet allowing them to be safely raised with the bridge deck. Other lift bridges copied this innovation.

== Gallery ==
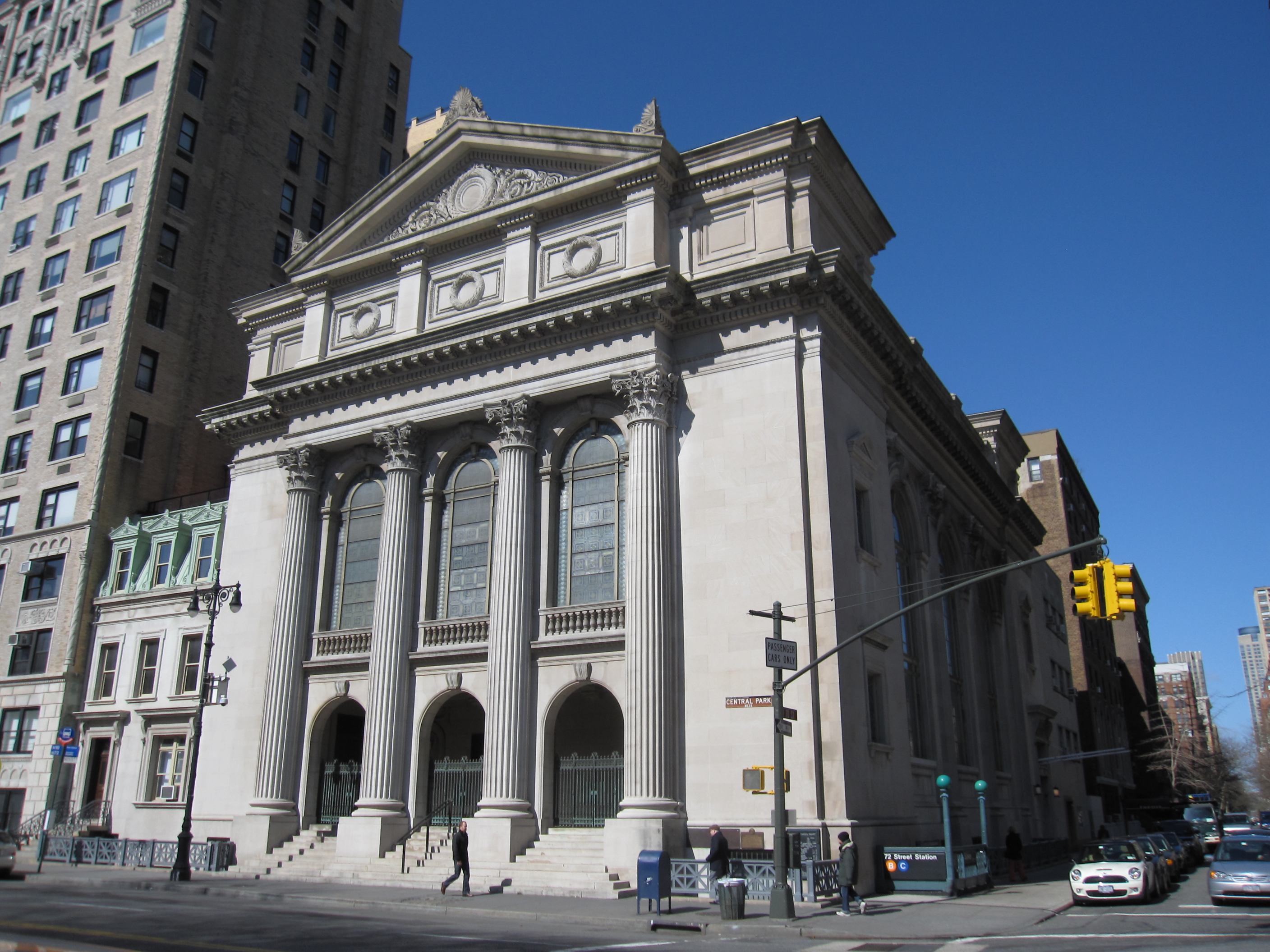
Congregation Shearith Israel, Central Park West and 70th Street, New York (1897)

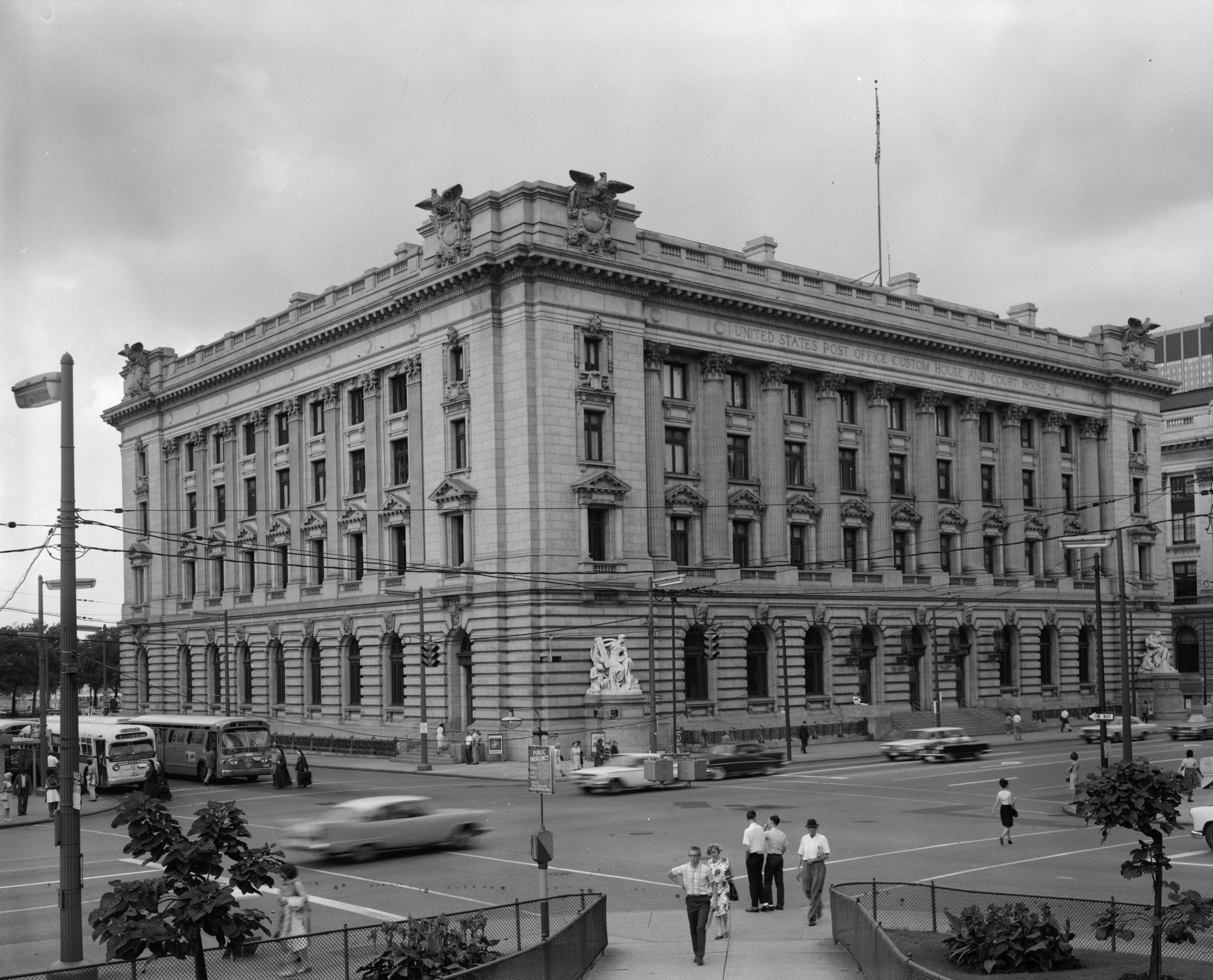
Brunner's 1910 Federal Building in downtown Cleveland, Ohio

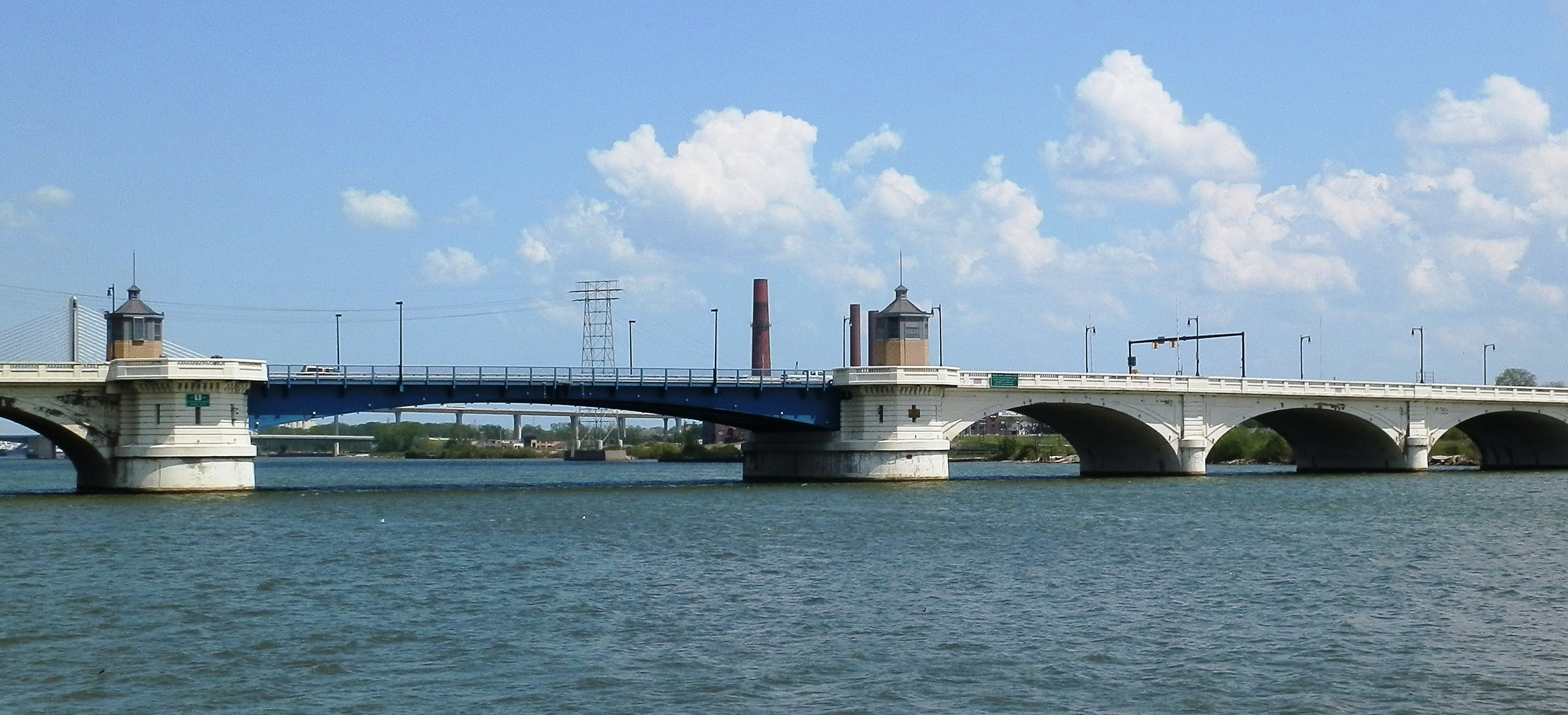
Brunner designed this bascule bridge over the Maumee River in Toledo, Ohio

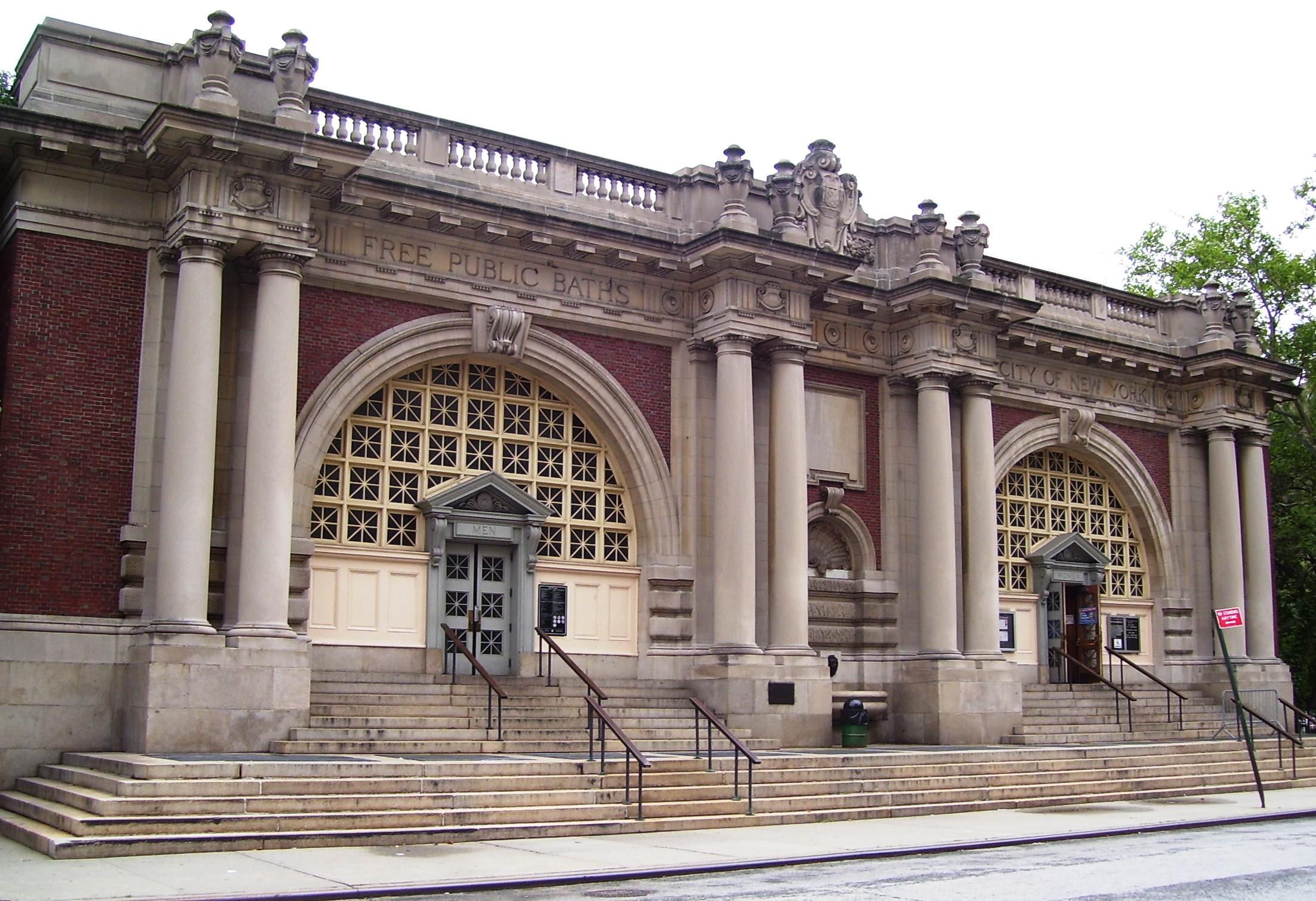
The Public Baths (1904-1906) in Manhattan at Asser Levy Place and 23rd Street, designed by Brunner with Martin Aiken
