= Rivington Street municipal bath =

Former bathhouse in Manhattan, New York

Coordinates: 40°43′0.5″N 73°58′36.5″W

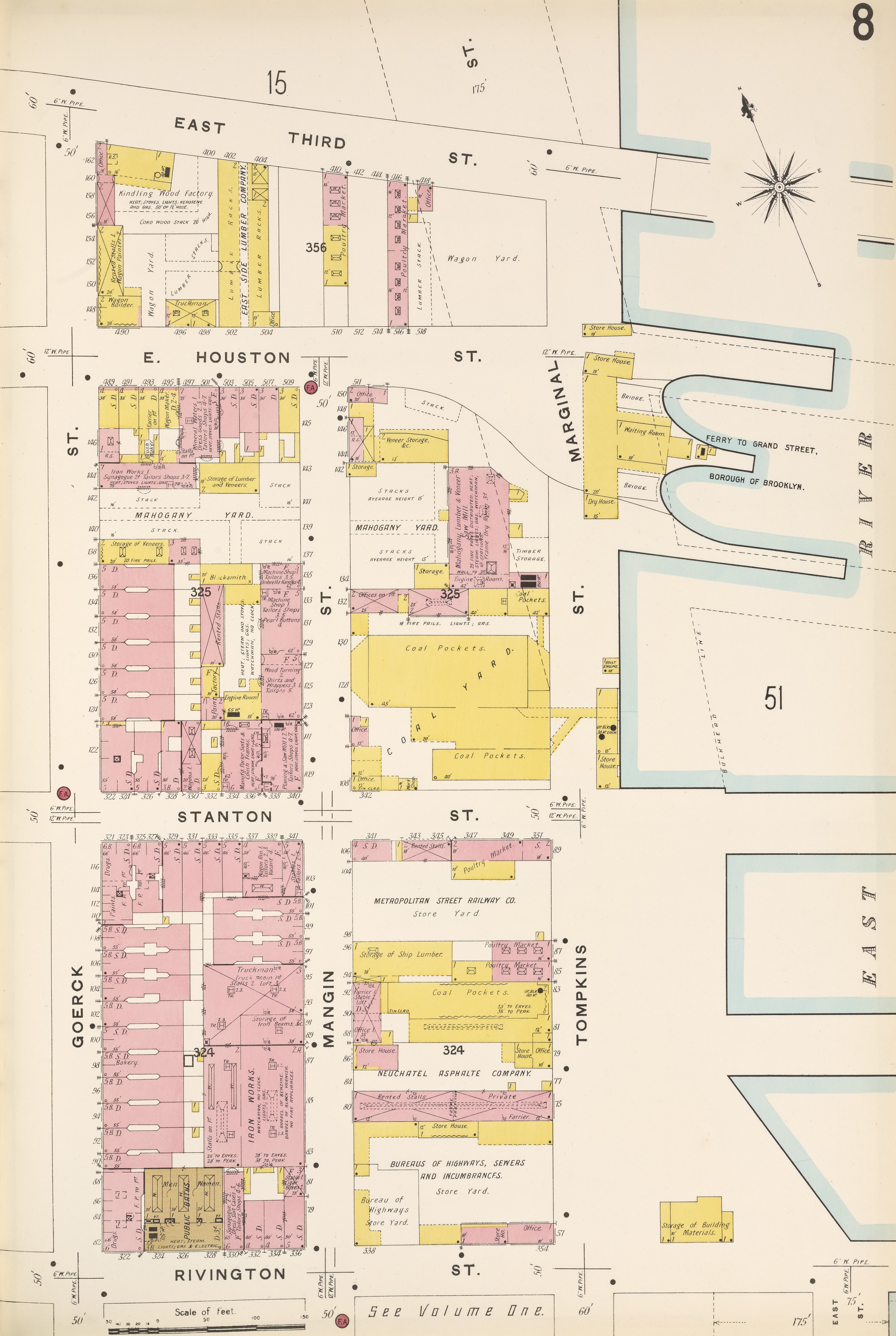
The public bath at 324–28 Rivington Street (lower left) on a map published in 1903

The Rivington Street municipal bath was the first bathhouse built with public funds in New York City. It was constructed on the Lower East Side of Manhattan, which was a densely populated and poor area. in 1900. Costing $100,000, a large sum for the time, the baths officially opened on March 23, 1901. The bath was patronized largely by Hebrews, Hungarians, and Russian Jews. The cost was on par with other bathhouse projects.

It featured 67 spray baths (which are currently showers), enabling patrons to take a total of 3,000 baths per day. Each bather was allotted a 20-minute shower. New York was the first state in the United States to pass a law making public baths compulsory. In the first five months of 1902, the Rivington Street municipal bath accommodated 224,876 bathers, of whom 66,256 were women and girls.

In 1895, a law was enacted making it mandatory to establish free public baths in cities in which the population exceeded 50,000 persons. Maintenance of these facilities was provided for by local health boards. Cities and villages having fewer than 100,000 people might construct public baths with loans on their credit or appropriate funds for their establishment. The 1895 law stated that the public baths were to be open for fourteen hours per day and that both hot and cold water were to be provided.

As the installation of showers in buildings became more common, the visits to the bath declined. Most of the bathhouses were maintained by the city as public swimming pools. Rivington Street no longer extends as far east, and the address became 326 Delancy Street. In 1975, the City of New York cemented the building in and it has been discontinued ever since. The community and the city explored ways to redevelop it in 2018.
