= North Inlet-Winyah Bay National Estuarine Research Reserve =

Protected area in South Carolina, United States

Coordinates: 33.316°N 79.181°W

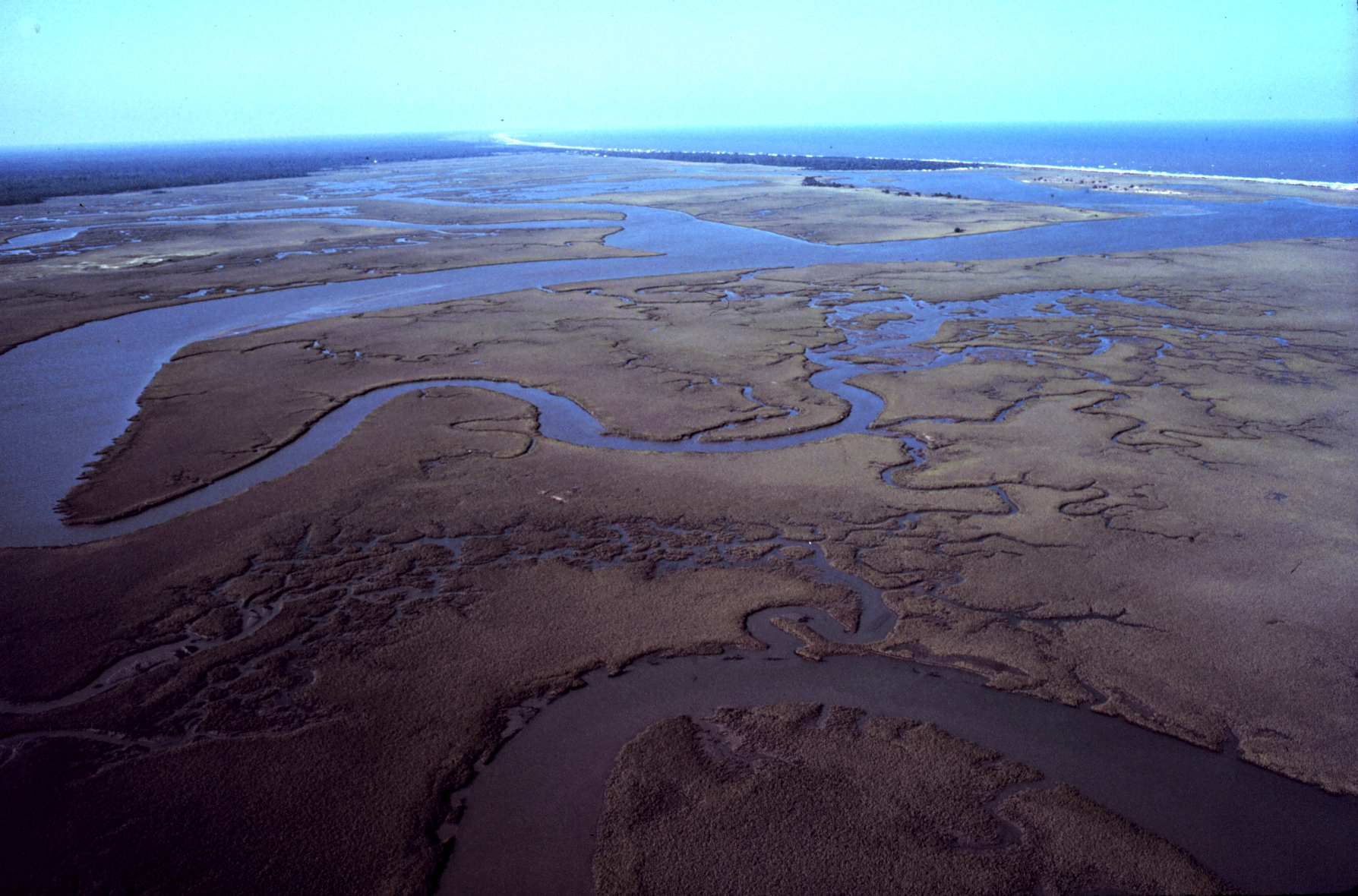
Aerial view of tidal creeks and marshes in North Inlet Estuary, Winyah Bay National Estuarine Research Reserve, October 2010

The North Inlet-Winyah Bay National Estuarine Research Reserve, in the U.S. State of South Carolina, features the salt marshes and ocean dominated tidal creeks of the North Inlet Estuary plus the brackish waters and marshes of the adjacent Winyah Bay Estuary. North Inlet is a relatively pristine system in which water and habitat quality are much higher than those in Winyah Bay. As the estuary with the third largest watershed on the east coast, Winyah Bay has been greatly influenced by agriculture, industry and other human activities. More than 90 percent of North Inlet's watershed is in its natural forested state

The reserve is home to many threatened and endangered species, including sea turtles, sturgeons, least terns and wood storks.

Reserve resources range from tidal and transitional marshes to oyster reefs, beaches, and inter-tidal flats and from coastal island forests to open waterways.
