= Shanghainese people in Hong Kong =

Hong Kongers native to Shanghai and the surrounding regions

North Point
- 北角
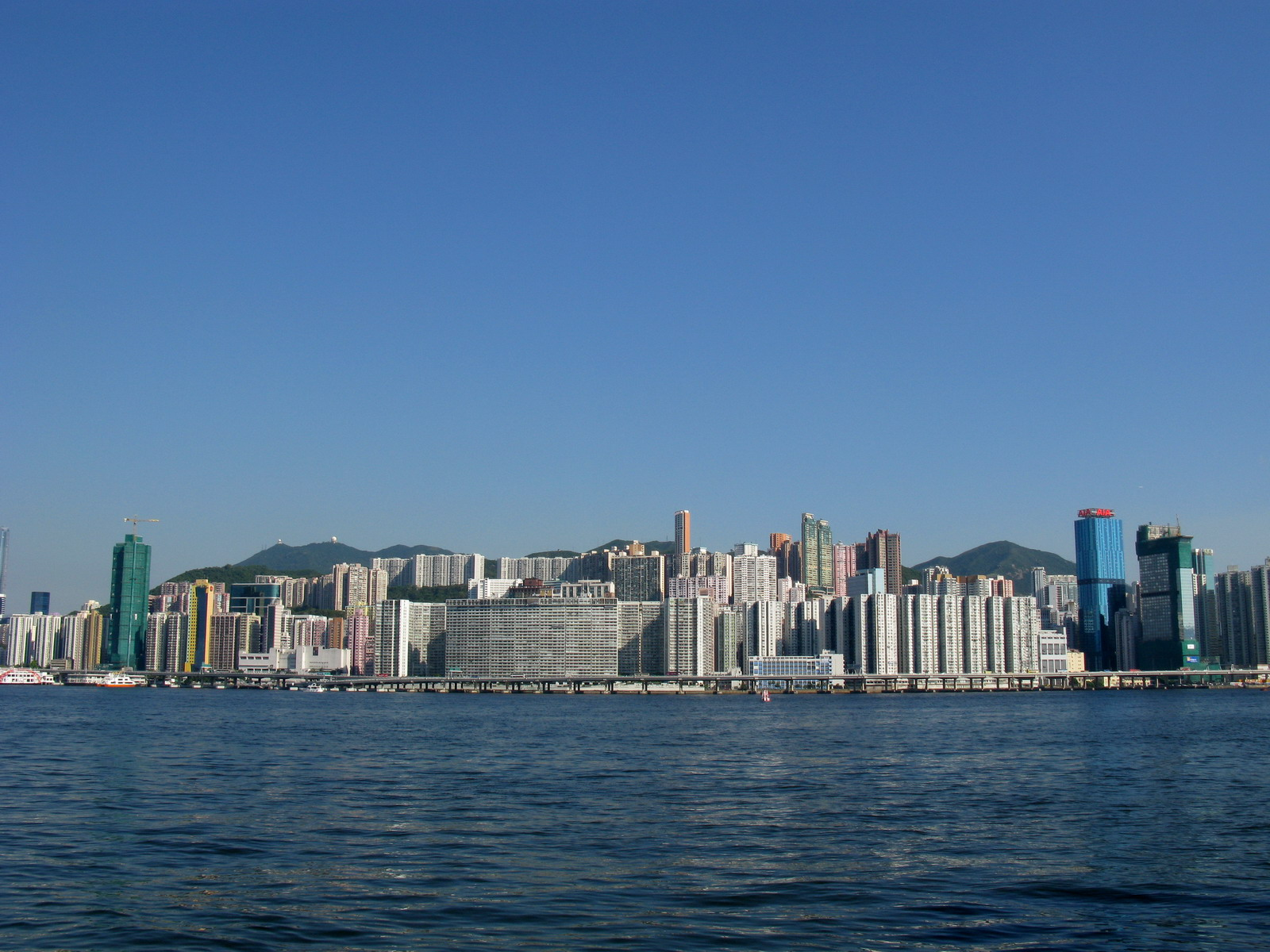
- North Point skyline in 2008

- Location within Hong Kong
- Coordinates: 22°17′23.978″N 114°12′2.4628″E

Shanghainese people in Hong Kong have played an important role in the region, despite being a relatively small portion of the Han Chinese population. "Shanghainese" is a term that refers to both the Wu Chinese language and the Han Chinese subgroups from the city of Shanghai and the peoples of the Jiangnan (Lower Yangtze Delta) region in Hong Kong more broadly, particularly those with ancestral homes in parts of southern Jiangsu (Kiangsu), northern Zhejiang (Chekiang) and Anhui provinces.

While a relatively small portion of the population compared to the Cantonese majority, Shanghainese people and their descendants have had a tremendous influence on the economy of Hong Kong helping transform the colony from a trading outpost into a global manufacturing and shipping hub. Shanghainese émigrés also had a major contribution to the cinema of Hong Kong, beginning with an exodus of filmmakers and actors fleeing the violence of the Second Sino-Japanese War and continuing after the Communist takeover of the mainland.

== Migration history ==
The flood of emigration of Shanghainese people from Shanghai to British Hong Kong began in 1937 with the onset of the Second Sino-Japanese War, and grew as the Chinese Civil War resumed in 1946. In total, an estimated 1.4 million people from Shanghai are estimated to have fled to Hong Kong as the communist takeover of mainland China drew near, enduring a 10-day rail journey, often switching to road transport or foot where tracks were damaged.

As Ming Chan of the Hoover Institution describes it, it was "nothing less than the exile of Chinese capitalism to Hong Kong", and is credited for Hong Kong's transformation from small trading outpost into a manufacturing powerhouse. Shanghainese people primarily settled in Tsuen Wan, Tsim Sha Tsui, Victoria Peak, and North Point. North Point in particular became known as "Little Shanghai." Later waves of ethnic Chinese migration, particularly Fujianese from the Chinese Indonesian and Chinese Filipino diasporas would diversify the neighborhood significantly, in turn dubbing parts of the district "Little Fujian".

Organizations like the Kiangsu-Chekiang Provincial Association (香港蘇浙滬同鄉會) helped many refugees, like the approximately 15,000 ex-soldiers, integrate into society by finding employment. Today the organization runs schools like the Kiangsu and Chekiang Primary School, which was one of the first school to teach primarily in Mandarin Chinese. Another organization, the Shanghai Fraternal Association (上海總會 (香港)), was founded in 1977 by Shanghainese-speaking business people and served as an exclusive dining club serving Shanghainese cuisine at a time when it was rare in Hong Kong. Membership in this organization eventually came to include Cantonese people as the Shanghainese population aged.

Because the Shanghainese came from an area of China other than Guangdong province, they were often called "Northerners" by Hong Kong locals, even though by most standards Shanghai is not part of Northern China. "Shanghainese" is a term that refers to not only the Wu Chinese language and the Han Chinese subgroups not just from the city of Shanghai but also of the peoples of the Jiangnan (Lower Yangtze Delta) region in Hong Kong more broadly, particularly those with ancestral homes in parts of southern Jiangsu (Kiangsu), northern Zhejiang (Chekiang) and Anhui province.

== Statistics ==
The 1961 Hong Kong census counted around 70,000 Shanghainese speakers, 2.6% of the population aged over 5. Around 90 percent of these were classed as immigrants. Less than 6 percent had arrived before 1945, while 36 percent had come between 1945 and 1955. Based on these statistics, no more than 30,000 Shanghainese would have been in Hong Kong to act as the catalyst for economic transformation in the early 1950s.

According to 2011 census data, the area with the highest concentration of Shanghainese speakers in Hong Kong is Fuk Loi constituency of Tsuen Wan.

Hong Kong has an estimated 150,000 people of Ningbo ancestry. The New York Times referred to the Ningbo business community as a "strong and clannish group of prosperous entrepreneurs." Ningbo merchants are considered one of the Ten Great Merchant Guilds in Chinese history.

According to census data, the percentage of people age 5 and up who were able to speak Shanghainese was 1.2%, 1.1% and 1.1% in 2006, 2011 and 2016 respectively.

=== 1961 census data of Shanghainese speakers by district ===
Percentage of Hong Kong Island residents speaking Shanghainese
Area	%
Central	1.1
Sheung Wan	0.4
West	1.5
Mid-levels/Pok Fu Lam	3.0
Peak	7.6
Wan Chai	1.8
Tai Hang	4.8
North Point	7.5
Shau Kei Wan	1.4
Aberdeen	1.2
South	2.1

Percentage of Kowloon residents speaking Shanghainese
Area	%
Tsim Sha Tsui	8.4
Yau Ma Tei	0.7
Mong Kok	0.8
Kowloon City	7.4
Sham Shui Po	1.1
Kwun Tong	3.1
Wong Tai Sin	2.9

Percentage of New Territories residents speaking Shanghainese
Area	%
Tsuen Wan	10.3
Tsing Yi	0.4
Ma Wan	0.4
North	0.3
Sai Kung	0.5
Sha Tin	2.8
Tai Po	0.8
Tuen Mun	0.4
Yuen Long	0.5

Other (Islands): 0.5%

Statistical notes

- Average: 2.64
- Standard Deviation: 2.93
- Coefficient of Variation: 1.13

== Influence on business ==
Prior to the arrival of Shanghainese businessmen, the economy of Hong Kong revolved heavily around its status as an international entrepôt. This changed with both the arrival of mainland Chinese capitalists, as well as the outbreak of the Korean War. Among the ethnic Chinese, the Shanghainese initially showed much less enthusiasm for establishing links with the local Cantonese than with the foreign expatriates establishment. They were favoured first by the British as business partners and later the mainland China CPC.

While many Shanghainese in Hong Kong had been successful industrialists prior to resettlement, they lost most of their fortunes after fleeing the mainland. A notable exception was the Ningbo native and shipping magnate Yue-Kong Pao, who managed to remit much of his family's wealth to Hong Kong before this became impossible after the communist takeover of Shanghai. Afterwards in Hong Kong, many Shanghainese people rebuilt their fortunes in textiles and clothing as well as other light industries like toy and plastics manufacturing. The Hong Kong authorities created favourable conditions for Shanghai business, which attracted textile, shipping and film moguls to the colony. In particular, the cotton spinning industry had already been established prior to the arrival of the Shanghainese. While still in Shanghai, some businessmen began transferring their capital to banks in Hong Kong, transporting imported equipment from Shanghai factories to Hong Kong warehouses, re-registering their ships in the port of Hong Kong, and then ferrying their families, their specialists and managers. The big tycoons were followed by the middle class - accountants, sales agents, tailors and small traders. As of 2002 almost all cotton mills in Hong Kong or those owned by Hong Kong investors in nearby Guangdong province are actually owned by Shanghainese. In the 1980s it was said that 80's of cotton spinning mills in Hong Kong were Shanghainese owned.

While these cotton mill owners tended to promote among relatives and kinsmen, much to the dismay of their Cantonese labourers, many Shanghainese dismissed the idea that there was nepotism at play.

Goodstat writes that although Shanghainese did have a significant impact on the economy of Hong Kong, their economic influence would be greatly exaggerated to "legendary" proportions, as this was a myth propagated by the British in later years.

Shanghainese people were more educated than the Cantonese population in Hong Kong at the time. Around 7% of Shanghainese in Hong Kong had attended university, compared to 2% of Cantonese speakers. However a quarter of Shanghainese had received no schooling at all, and Shanghainese were less than 10% of Hong Kong's university graduates in the early post-World War II period.

Shanghainese people also came to play a significant role in commercial and financial links between mainland China and Hong Kong. The major mainland Chinese commercial presence in Hong Kong up to the 1980s comprised the state-owned banks; a high proportion of their upper management were of Shanghai origin. As of the 1990s, it is said that many Shanghainese-owned banking firms would promote among people of Shanghainese descent. The Shanghainese did not immediately re-invest in the Mainland after reform and opening up in the 1970s, preferring to re-acquire old properties confiscated by the Communist Party.

Shanghainese people had considerable influence on the entertainment industry as well. The Sino-Japanese war and subsequent Battle of Shanghai brought and exodus of filmmakers to Hong Kong, as did the other wave with the communist takeover of the mainland. Ningbo natives Run Run Shaw and his brothers moved their media company from Shanghai to Hong Kong during the Sino-Japanese War and would later found prominent television channel TVB.

Several of the founders and prominent shareholders of Suntec Investment Private Limited, a premier vehicle for Hong Kong investment in Singapore, are of Shanghainese descent. Founded in 1977, this corporation is behind real estate developments like Suntec City, through its subsidiary Suntec Real Estate Investment Trust. Cooperative Strategies - Asian Pacific Perspectives (1997) by Beamish and Killing use it as a case study for illustrating the important of guanxi, specifically personal friendships and regional ancestral network relationships in Chinese business culture.

== Culture ==
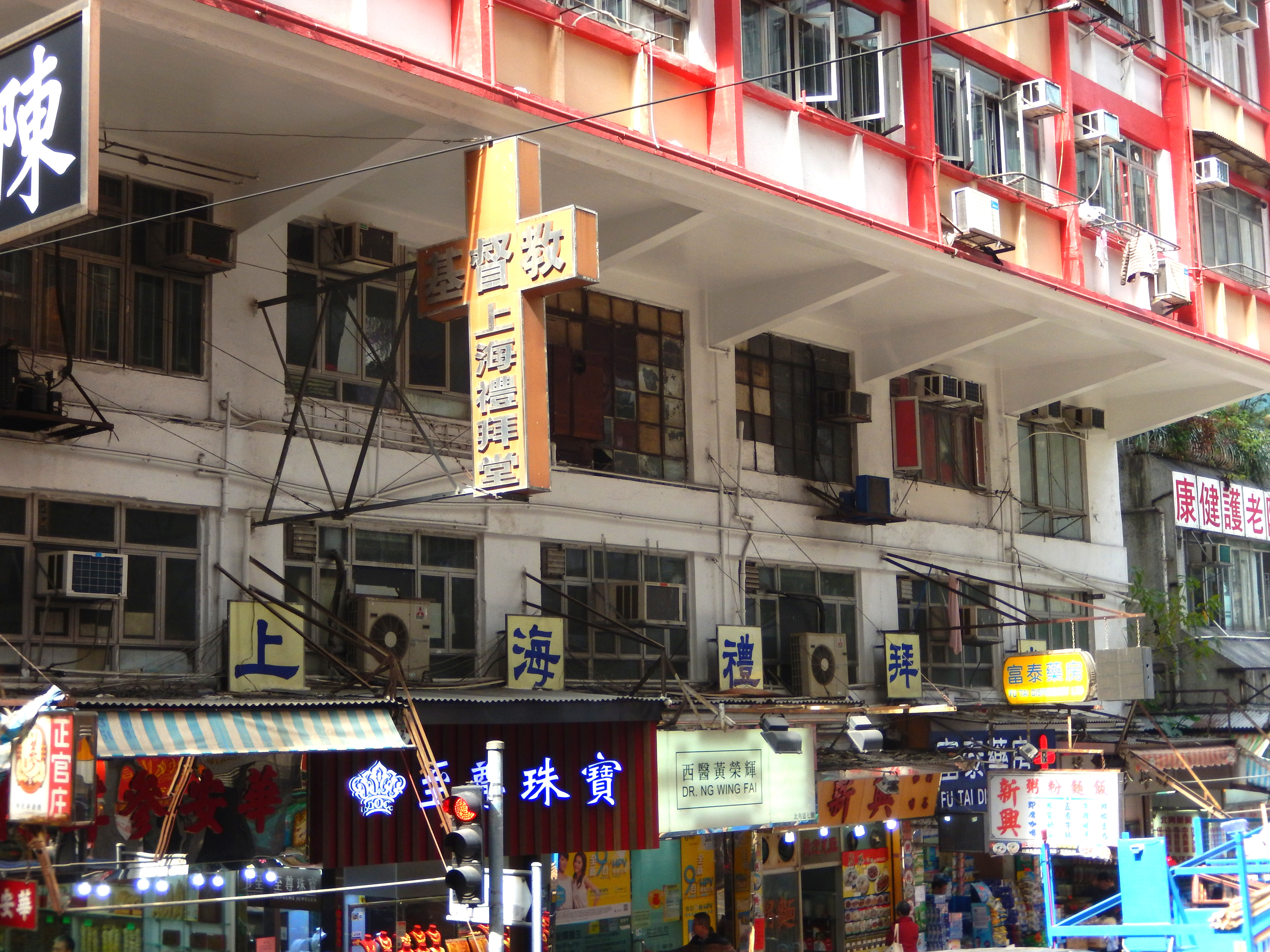
Christian Shanghai Church in North Point Road, North Point, Hong Kong. Shanghainese, Mandarin and Cantonese are used.

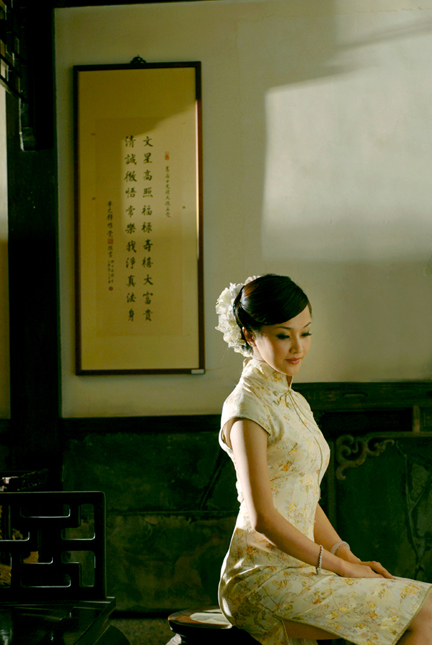
Woman wearing a cheongsam (qipao)

Shanghainese tailors helped popularize forms of dress in Hong Kong like the Cheongsam (called Qipao in Mandarin and Zansae in Shanghainese). Additionally, the influx of Shanghainese people led to the development and popularization of traditional Shanghai-style barber shops in many Shanghainese communities, emphasizing traditionalism and customer first policies.

Shanghainese pedicure in Hong Kong has been called the "World's Most Amazing Pedicure" by Time Magazine. When Shanghainese businessmen moved to Hong Kong there was a demand for pedicure service, in the past only the wealthy could afford these services. Now they are very common and can be found in many public bathing facilities, spas and barbershops." The pedicures do not originate in Shanghai itself but rather surrounding rural areas, but also the city of Yangzhou, where the Bathing Culture has existed since the Song dynasty. While many of the public bathhouses which provided pedicures disappeared due to urban development from the 1990s to 2000's, the services remained. The pedicures are thought to have first appeared in Hong Kong in the late 1940s with the opening of Shanghai Tong Hing Yuk Tak Bathhouse (closed in 2006).

== In popular culture ==
The 1960 Wong Tin-lam film The Wild, Wild Rose is an adaptation of the opera Carmen set to a backdrop of the clash between Shanghainese and Cantonese cultural and linguistic practices. The films of Wong Kar-wai, like In the Mood for Love and Days of Being Wild feature Shanghainese dialogue and explore themes of nostalgia for an old Shanghai left behind by emigres, with Wong himself being born in Shanghai.

Maggie Cheung, born in Hong Kong to parents who came from Shanghai, has frequently portrayed Shanghainese characters on screen, particularly in collaboration with director Wong Kar-wai.

== Notable people ==
Prominent Shanghainese politicians include Chief Executives of Hong Kong Tung Chee-hwa and Carrie Lam, Chief Secretary for Administration Anson Chan (Her father Fang Shin-hau was a banker and textile businessman who moved his family to the British colony of Hong Kong in 1948), and former Chief Justice Yang Ti-liang. Other well-known Hong Kong people who have family origins in Shanghai include the film director Wong Kar-wai.

== See also ==
- Hong Kong people in Shanghai
- The Hongkong and Shanghai Banking Corporation, however Chinese people were barred from working for this firm for many years
- Chekiang First Bank, a bank that catered towards Shanghainese emigres
- Kiangsu and Chekiang Primary School, North Point
- Guanxi

== Bibliography ==
- Goodstadt, Leo F. (2010), "The Shanghainese: Colonial Allies, Colonial Heirs", Uneasy Partners: The Conflict Between Public Interest and Private Profit in Hong Kong, Hong Kong University Press, ISBN 978-988-8028-09-2
- Wong, Siu-lun (1988). Emigrant Entrepreneurs: Shanghai Industrialists in Hong Kong. Department of Sociology and Director Social Sciences Research Centre Wong Siu-Lun.
