= Chinese bathhouses =

Chinese bathhouses have thousands of years of history and consist of numerous variations. The Chinese word for bathhouses in general is zǎotáng (澡堂); in the stricter sense, this may refer to traditional, low-cost Chinese bathhouses, to contrast with modern, upmarket Chinese bathhouses known as xǐyù zhōngxīn (洗浴中心) or just xǐyù (洗浴). Hot springs and spas are called wēnquán (温泉).

== Overview ==
Zǎotáng are traditional bathhouses that were once widespread in China, as most houses used to be built without running water or sanitation; the majority of these bathhouses have since disappeared due to modernization rendering them unnecessary. Zǎotáng are sex-segregated and have facilities like lockers, shower rooms, communal baths, lounge areas, and free spaces for people to socialize. Meanwhile, some relatively large bathhouses offer services such as manicures, pedicures, massages, rubdowns, shaving, ear cleaning, and food with extra cost. Some zǎotáng may also have saunas, gyms, and private baths available.

Xǐyù zhōngxīn, which translates to "bathing and recreation centers", also known as simply xǐyù or "bath centers", are the more popular bathhouse choice in modern times and are treated as a leisurely activity rather than a necessity like traditional zǎotáng were. They may operate for 24 hours a day and are much more elaborate; they usually have restaurants, cinemas, video game stations, karaoke rooms, childcare centers, and optional overnight accommodation. Xǐyù can trace their roots back to traditional Chinese bathhouses, but also draw influences from day spas and hotels. Shenyang in Liaoning province is considered the "bathing capital" of China due to its large number of xǐyù available.

There are many natural hot springs or wēnquán in China that are used for public bathing, some of them with free entry while others have been turned into resorts. Huaqing Pool is one of the most famous hot spring complexes, as the site has been used as an imperial palace for emperors' short stays away from the capital for more than 3,000 years.

== Regional differences ==
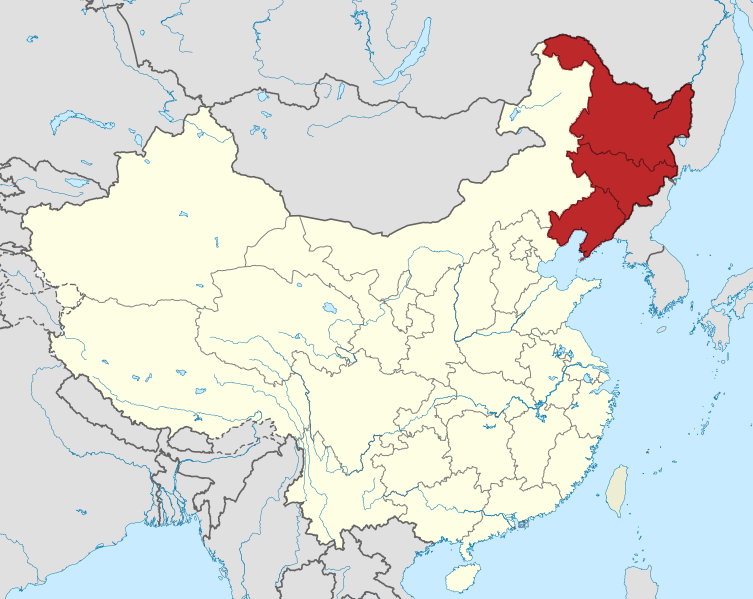
Northeast China

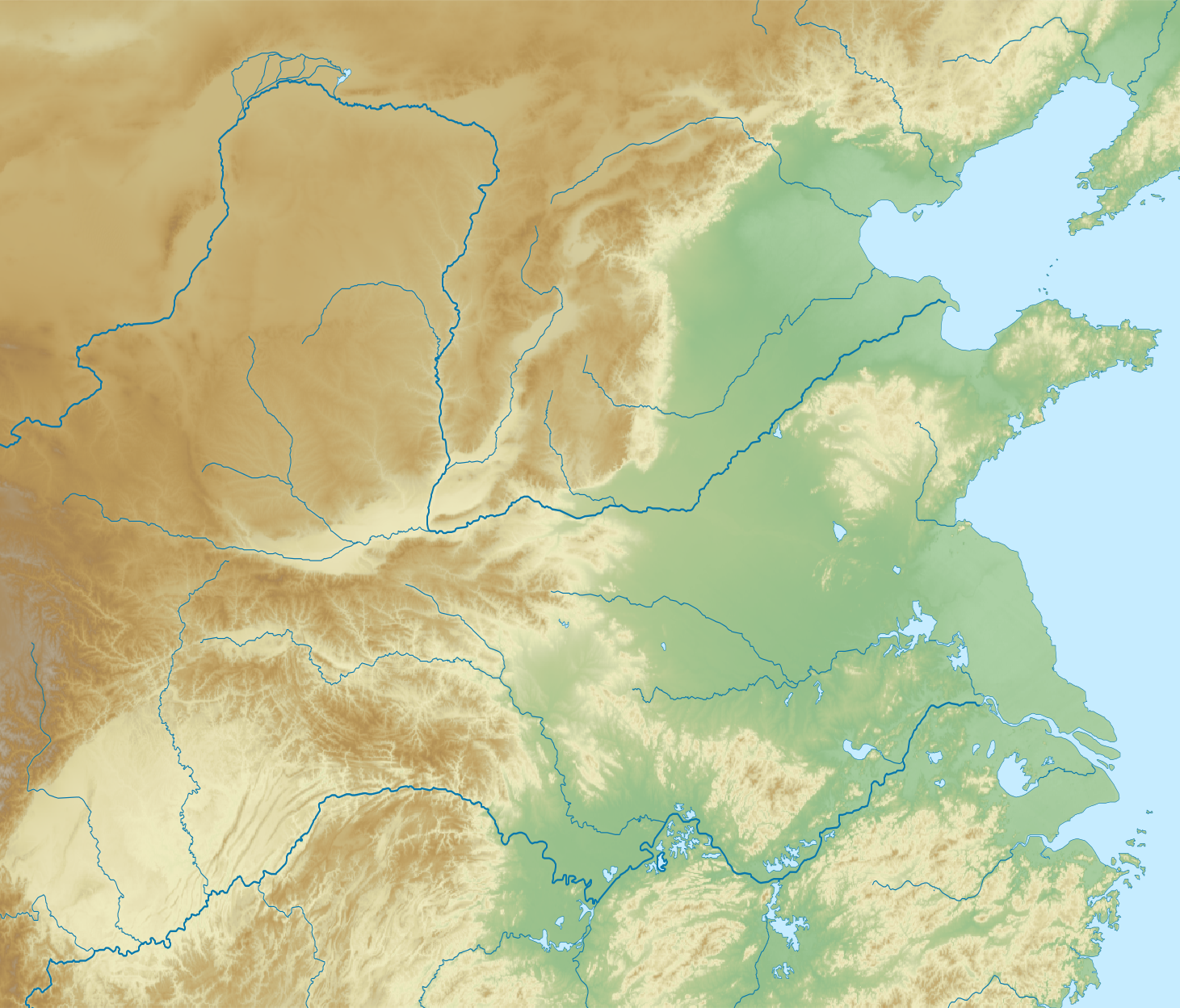
North China Plain

Bathhouses are most common in the North China Plain, Northeast China, and Yangtze River Delta. The provinces of China with the largest number of zǎotáng are Liaoning, Shandong, Anhui, Jiangsu, and Zhejiang. They are less common in far south China and are rare in northwest China.

=== Northern China ===
Northern Chinese bathhouses focus on cuōzǎo (搓澡) which is the custom of vigorously scrubbing the skin with a scrubbing cloth known as a cuōzǎojīn (搓澡巾). In Northeast China, many famous bathhouses sit by natural springs. In the 1950s, Northeast China saw a huge influx of workers. They lived in self-contained factory towns with all the necessities they required. This included basic bathhouses for working-class people to not only clean themselves after a long day of hard work, but also as a place to relax.

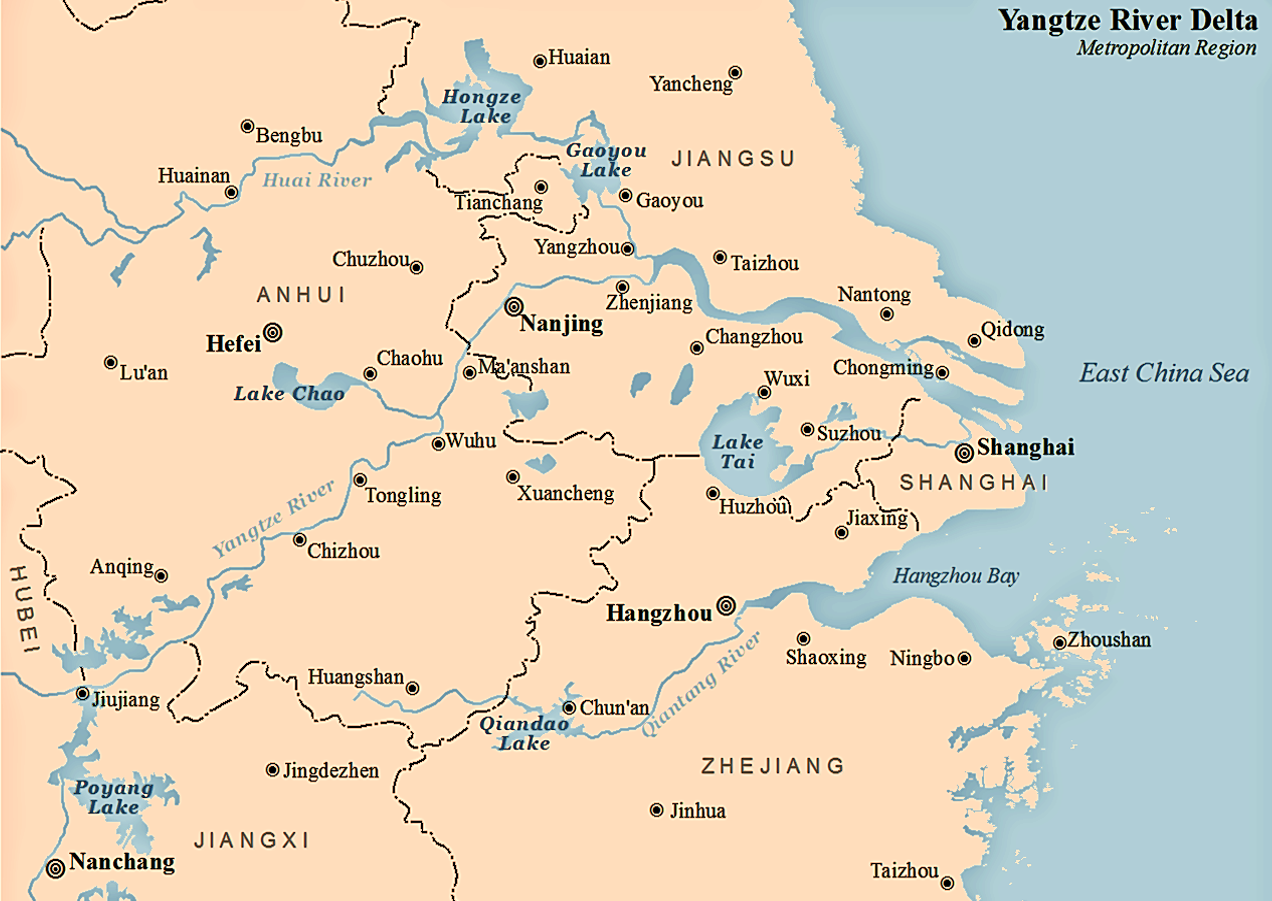
Map of Yangtze Delta city belt

=== Southern China ===
The city of Yangzhou in Jiangsu province is regarded as the birthplace of southern Chinese bathing culture and its bathhouses are considered the most fanciful among all traditional varieties of bathhouses in China. The Yangzhou bathhouses have a massage routine that consists of back-rubs (擦背 cā bèi), scalding (烫背 tàng bèi), and “drumming" (敲背 qiāo bèi). A genuine Yangzhou bath experience involves receiving green tea to ward off the chill, being enveloped in a towel while soaking, and being meticulously dried by a team of attendants. These bathhouses employ assistants known as "potboys" to serve tea, fetch food from the outside, and fold clothes. They also feature live performances of traditional arts such as pingshu or Yangzhou opera from musicians and storytellers.

== History ==
Bathrooms and urban water supply systems appeared in China as early as the Shang dynasty (1600 – 1046 BCE), such as the Dongzhouyang archaeological site in Henan Province. Bathing culture in Chinese literature can also be traced back to the Shang dynasty, where oracle bone inscriptions describe the people washing hair and body in bath, suggesting people paid attention to personal hygiene. Bathrooms were called bi (Chinese: 湢), and bathtubs were made of bronze or timber.

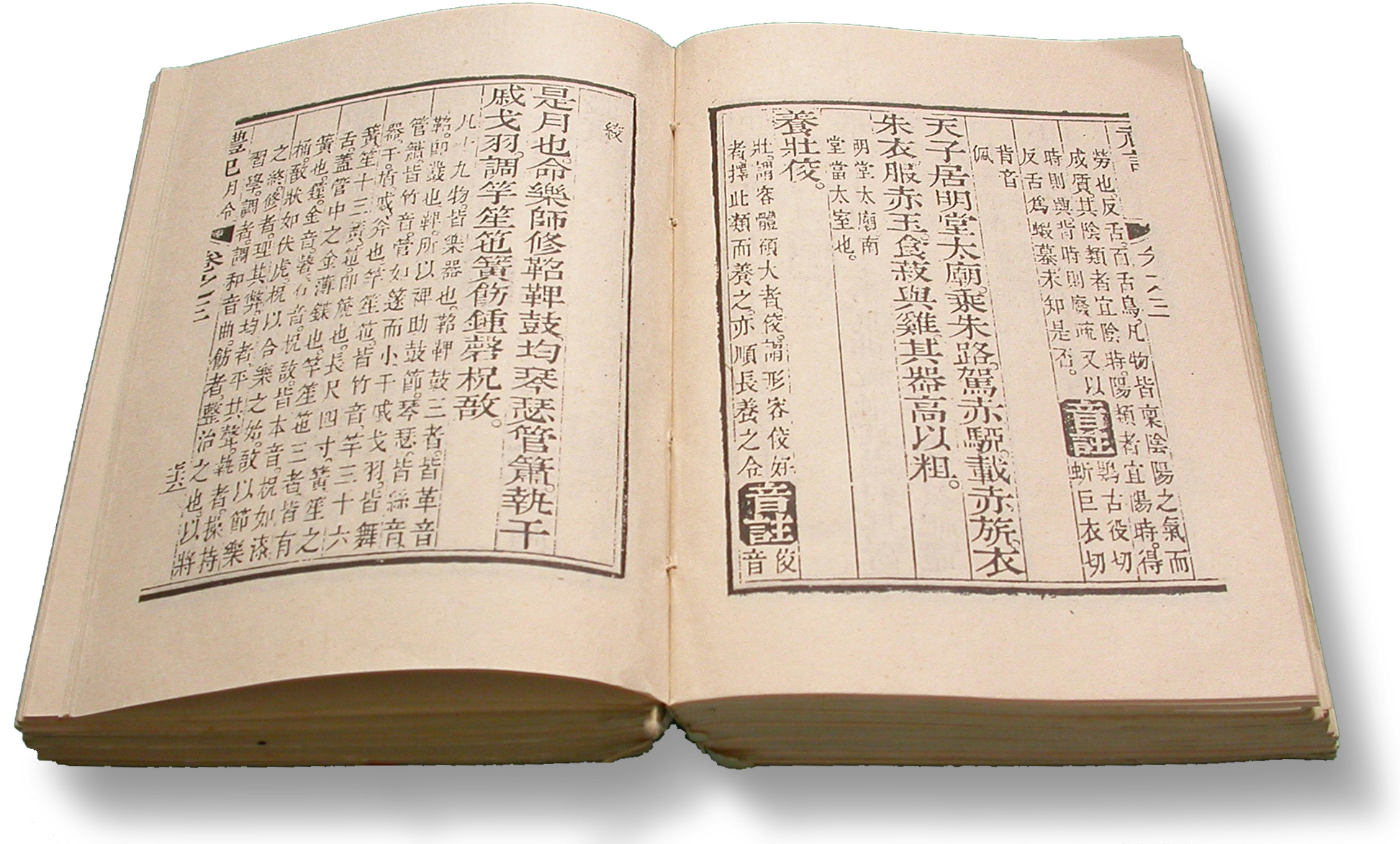
Book of Rites, Liji

The Book of Rites, a work regarding Zhou dynasty (1046 – 256 BCE) ritual, politics, and culture compiled during the Warring States period, states that people should take a hot bath every five days and wash their hair every three days. It was also considered good manners to take a bath provided by the host before the dinner.

In the Han dynasty (202 BC – 9 AD, 25–220 AD), bathing became a regular activity every five days. Bath beans, a powdery soap mixture of ground beans, cloves, eaglewood, flowers, and even powdered jade, was a luxury toiletry in the Han dynasty; commoners used powdered beans without spices.

Luxurious bathhouses built around hot springs were recorded in the Tang dynasty（618 AD – 907 AD).

While royal bathhouses and bathrooms were common among ancient Chinese nobles and commoners, the public bathhouse was a relatively late development. In the Song dynasty (960–1279), public bathhouses became popular and ubiquitous, and bathing became an essential part of social life and recreation.

By the Yuan dynasty (1271 AD - 1368 AD), bathhouses were known as hùntáng (混堂), which means "mixing hall". They provided massage, manicure, rubdowns, ear cleaning, food, and beverages. Marco Polo, who traveled to China during the Yuan dynasty, noted Chinese bathhouses used coal for heating, which he had never seen in Europe. At that time coal was so plentiful that Chinese people of every social class took frequent baths, either in public baths or in bathrooms in their own homes.

A typical Ming dynasty (1368 AD - 1644 AD) bathhouse had slabbed floors and brick dome ceilings. A huge boiler was installed in the back of the house, connected with the bathing pool through a tunnel. Water could be pumped into the pool by turning wheels attended by staff.

China's oldest existing bathhouse is Wengtang (瓮堂) in Nanjing, which was first established in the early Ming dynasty as the bathhouse of the Porcelain Tower of Nanjing. The bathhouse was in operation for over 600 years and was shut down in 2014 with future plans uncertain. The bathhouse is classified as a protected cultural relic by the Jiangsu provincial government.

In the late Qing Dynasty and early Republic of China, bathing, as part of a clean lifestyle, began to receive social attention and promotion. As a result, public bathhouses sprang up in cities, and in the first half of the 20th century, bathhouses began to evolve into important bathing places for people.

Since the late 20th century, many urban bathhouses in China have shifted from basic washing centers to larger leisure centers (xǐyù zhōngxīn) that offer dining, beauty treatments, games, and accommodation. Many traditional neighborhood bathhouses face dwindling patronage due to rising rents, and new ones have turned to attracting younger urban consumers.

In the 21st century, some cities in China have “luxury bathhouses” that offer traditional hot pools and saunas, as well as branded spa-like services. Some include dining and overnight accommodations.

== In popular culture ==
Shuangxingtang, a traditional Chinese bathhouse in Beijing, was the primary setting of the 1999 Chinese film Shower, directed by Zhang Yang.

Bath Buddy is a 2020 film directed by Yi Xeroxing that centers on a bathhouse business. It topped the Chinese weekend box office upon its release.

== See also ==
- Bathing culture in Yangzhou
- Public bathing
- List of hot springs
