= Shanghai-style barber shop =

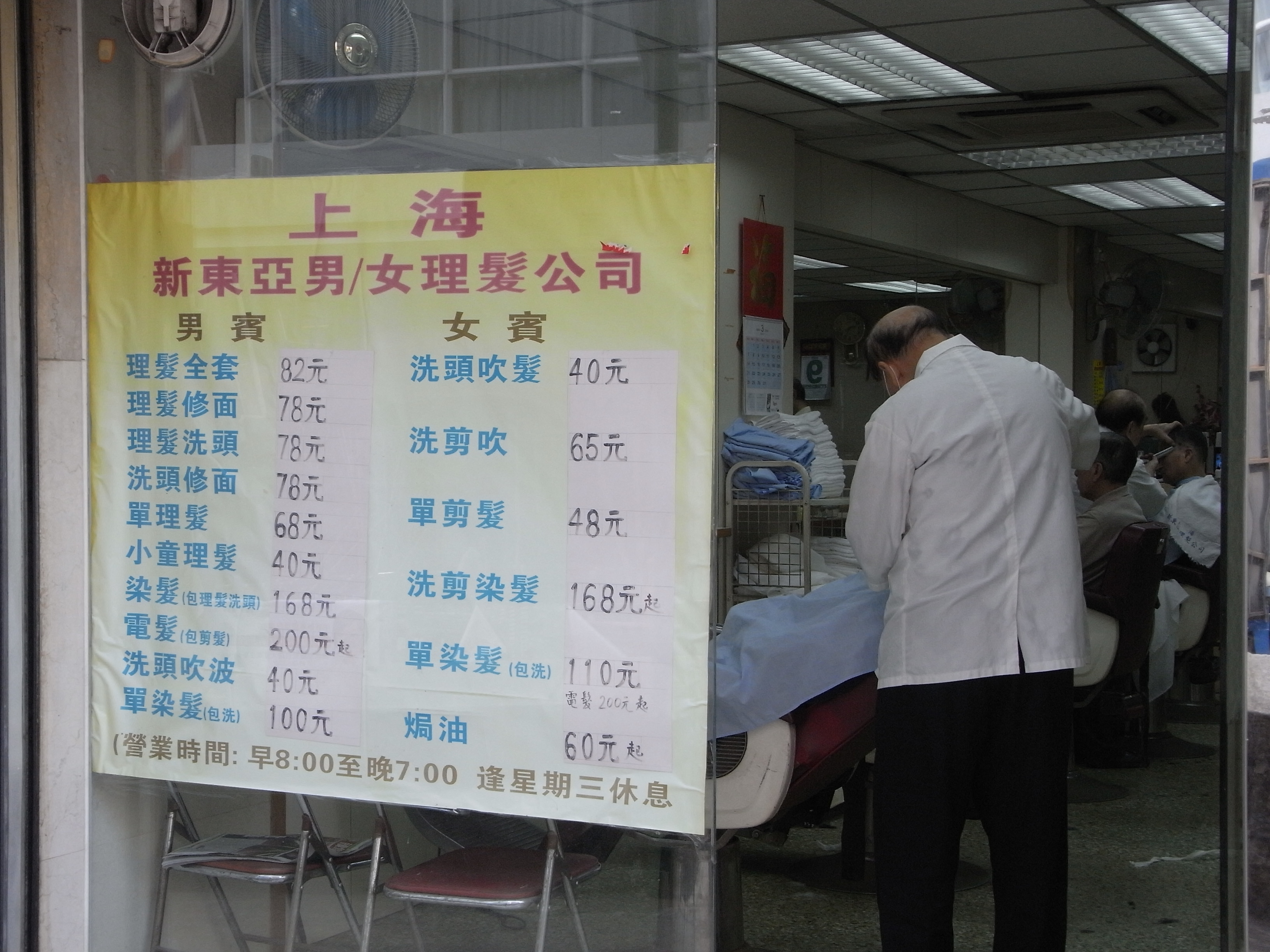
Uniformed barbers at work in Sai Ying Pun

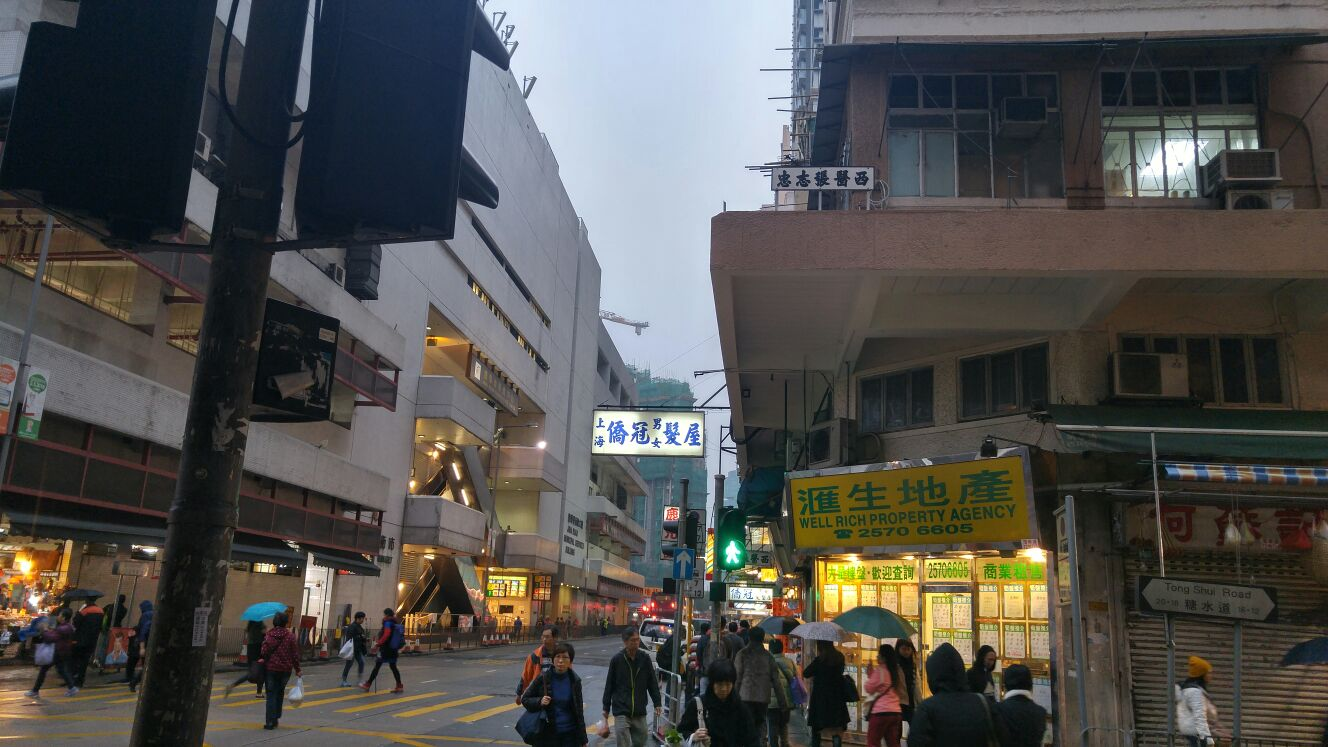
An old-style Shanghai barber shop above a busy Hong Kong street

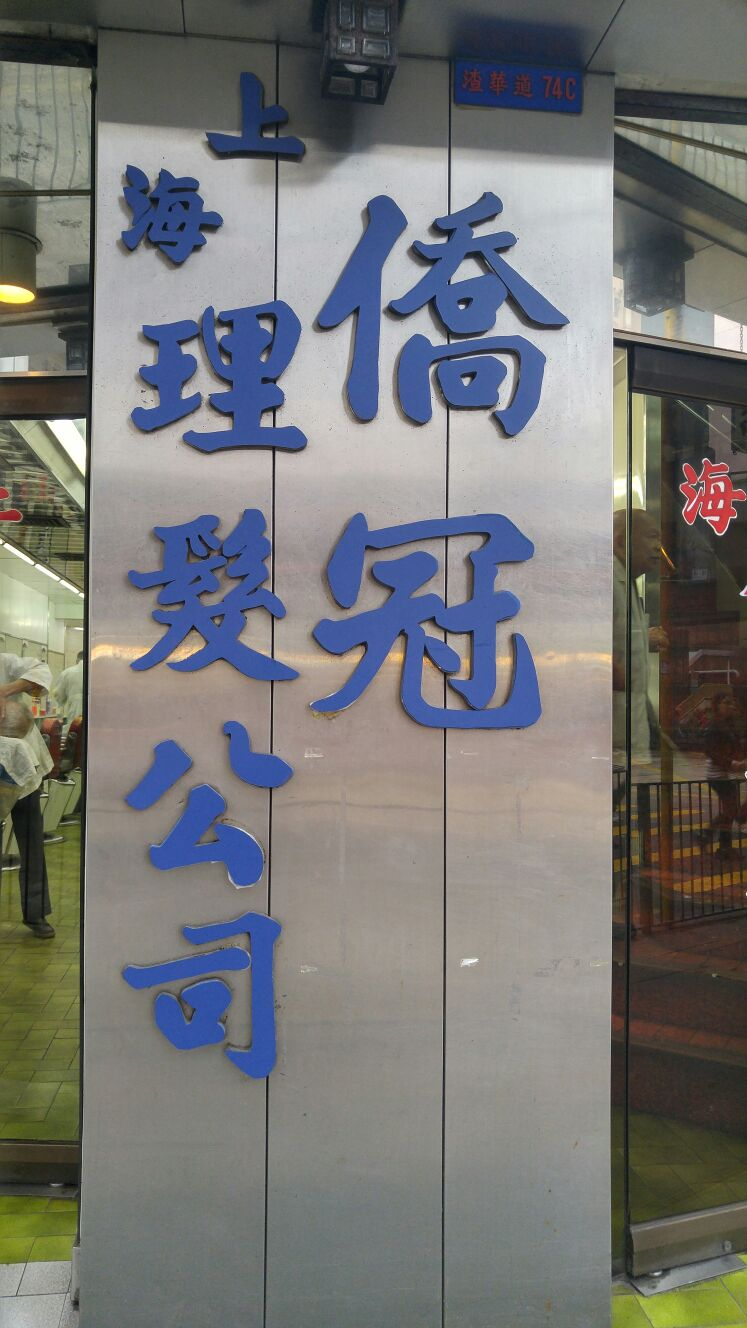
Shanghai Kiu Kwen Barbershop (上海僑冠男女理髮屋) in North Point

Shanghai-Style barber shops, as their name suggest, are a kind of barber shops that are closely related to Shanghai. Shanghai-style barbering is distinctive from other schools of the same craft, especially in Hong Kong. Many barbers left Shanghai for Hong Kong mainly in the 1950s; in this new place of residence, they opened many barber shops, using a similar business model and giving haircuts which were fashionable in Shanghai back then. In Hong Kong, their service was popular among higher class people in the period of 1950s–1970s, offering a range of now-classical types of haircut. Other than hair-cutting, Shanghai style barber shops provide different unique services include trimming, massaging, nails clipping, etc. Despite the sunset of Shanghai style barber shop in Hong Kong in the modern days, it still attracts loyal customers, especially among males, and costs around HK$70 for a haircut and shave using traditional clippers.

== History ==
=== Golden age in Shanghai (1920s–1930s) ===
Many wealthy and middle-class people who could afford a high quality of life settled in Shanghai in the 1920s and 1930s. Western-style barber shops were initially popular among them due to a trend toward admiring Western culture. However, overseas Chinese businessmen, ambitious entrepreneurs, and local Shanghainese business owners soon recognized the profit potential of hair styling. Through their shrewd business strategies, Shanghai-style barber shops increasingly replaced both Western-style and traditional local shops.

=== Golden age in Hong Kong (1950s–1970s) ===
Between 1940 and 1950, many Shanghainese immigrated to Hong Kong with their capital and skills. Some of them were Shanghai-style barbers. They had a concept of grooming to retune and upgrade Hong Kong’s grooming culture in those earlier times. As Hong Kong became the colony of British, the situation changed and allowed them to develop in this new environment with their professional skills.

During the heyday of the Shanghai-style barber shop in the 1960s to 1970s, every industry in Hong Kong was booming as the society was developing. According to the owner of Shanghai-style Ngan Kwan Salon in Un Chau Street, Shamshuipo which has a history of 40 years, “At the peak of the business, the salon employed as many as 36, including barbers, hair washers, cosmeticians, and manicurists.”

=== Sunset age in Hong Kong (After the 1970s) ===
The development of Shanghai style barber shop started to decline since the 1970s till now. There are few barber shops scattered in Hong Kong. There are mainly four reasons for the decline of the industry. According to one of the barbers Mr. Ma of Shanghai-style Ngan Kwan Salon in Un Chau Street, Shamshuipo, the salon employed more than 30 workers during peak hour in the old days. But now there are only nine barbers left.

Firstly, many barbers retired. According to the Shanghai-style Ngan Kwan Salon in Un Chau Street, Shamshuipo, one of the barbers Mr. Ma 'Most of them left because they were getting old and wanted to retire. 'Also, their children have all grown up, and they don't need to work anymore. Secondly, there is a lack of new blood participation. The decline in the business has also led to fewer workers in the industry. Barber Wong and his peers now have to do everything themselves; hair washing, cutting, blow-drying and shaving. There are no newcomers entered the industry for the past 20 years. Barber Wong said if they want to be a hairstylist, they'd rather go to those modern salons and this had hastened the industry's decline. Thirdly, there is a rise in rents. Lin, who is in charge of beauty treatment and manicure at a Shanghai barber shop in North Point said rent is the hardest thing to cover in their operation. Fourthly, there is the changing trend of beauty. Where they were once seen as stylish, Shanghai barber shops are now seen as old-fashioned.

== Culture ==
=== Fashion created in the old days ===
Shanghai barbers, coming from a modern and developed city, brought classic Shanghai hairstyles to Hong Kong, attracting people from high class in the city from 1950s–1970s. Haircutting is popular before Lunar New Year Festival, meaning good luck and a new change for the coming year According to a Shanghai barber, Yan, he commented that haircutting was an act to show self-respect other than styles. For men, the barbers would give a short and neat hairstyle, like an “egg tart” cut (Pompadour hairstyle), which were populated among professionals and educational people in the old times, and an Omega (nickname for a flip) for women. Customers could often have their chemical-free perms last for a week than a modern salon. The youngest look provided for men is only the hairstyles in the 80s while hairstyles of female pop stars in the 70s for ladies.

Hairstyles for men and women

- The professional cut (花旗裝)
- The butch cut (圓頭裝, 游泳裝)
- The Army cut (陸軍裝)
- The flat top cut (平頭裝)
- Shaved head (剃頭)
- Pompadour cut (蛋撻頭)
- Omega (奧米加頭)

== Services ==
Shanghai-style barber shops are different from modern salons. They give newspaper instead of magazine, and also hot tea, towel and cigarettes which modern salon will not provide. However, cigarettes are not allowed nowadays due to the Hong Kong law. Male and female services are separated, there are gentlemen’s department and ladies’ department. Men usually simply shave their hair, women will ask for hair styling such as curling hair. They provide services based on the “Customer First” concept. Other than cutting hair, they also provide other services such as clipping nails, shining shoes, cleaning ears, combing and trimming eyebrows, massaging neck and shoulders. Shanghai-style barber shops keep everything same for over 50 years, they remain the same decoration, same hair cutting skill and same hairstyle. Most of the Shanghai barber insist on using hand instead of electronic machines because they believe that handmade is better. "We do not use electric clippers for trimming or shaving. We use a pair of manual hair clippers, which we call 'the frog.' These are no longer in production though."Gao Detian, a Shanghai barber said.
