= Hong Kong people in Shanghai =

== Hong Kong people in Shanghai ==
Hong Kong people in Shanghai constitute a steadily growing community. According to statistics released by the Shanghai Municipal Government, only 3,432 Hong Kong residents were working in Shanghai as of October 2003. By December 2004, this figure had increased to approximately 6,680, reflecting a rapid expansion of the Hong Kong expatriate workforce in the city.

=== Employment ===
A majority of Hong Kong residents in Shanghai are employed in the general services sector (60.2%), followed by manufacturing (13.9%), real estate (5.0%), finance and insurance (5.1%), and other industries (12.3%). Most are engaged in managerial or professional roles. Many were recruited in Hong Kong and subsequently transferred to Shanghai by Hong Kong–based or multinational companies, while others established their own enterprises in the city. The rate of population growth has been moderated by increasing competition from highly educated local professionals who typically command lower salary levels.

With the appreciation of the Renminbi, a growing number of Hong Kong residents working in Shanghai—previously paid in foreign currencies such as the United States dollar—have shown a preference for receiving their salaries in local currency. In terms of property ownership, Hong Kong residents living in Shanghai, along with residents from Macau and Taiwan, are subject to regulatory restrictions that limit them to purchasing one residential property per Home Return Permit holder, under the so-called “one permit, one house” policy. The Shanghai municipal authorities have, at times, proposed relaxing this limit to allow up to three properties per permit holder.

=== Associations ===
Representative organizations include the Hong Kong Chamber of Commerce in Shanghai, which was established in 1996 and had approximately 700 members by 2007.

=== In popular culture ===
The topic has also appeared in popular media, notably in the 2006 television drama A Beautiful New World (美麗新天地), produced by Television Broadcasts Limited (TVB), which depicted the experiences of Hong Kong people living and working in Shanghai.

== See also ==
- Shanghainese people in Hong Kong
- The Hongkong and Shanghai Banking Corporation.
