= Bathing culture in Yangzhou =

Culture of bathing in Yangzhou, Jiangsu, China

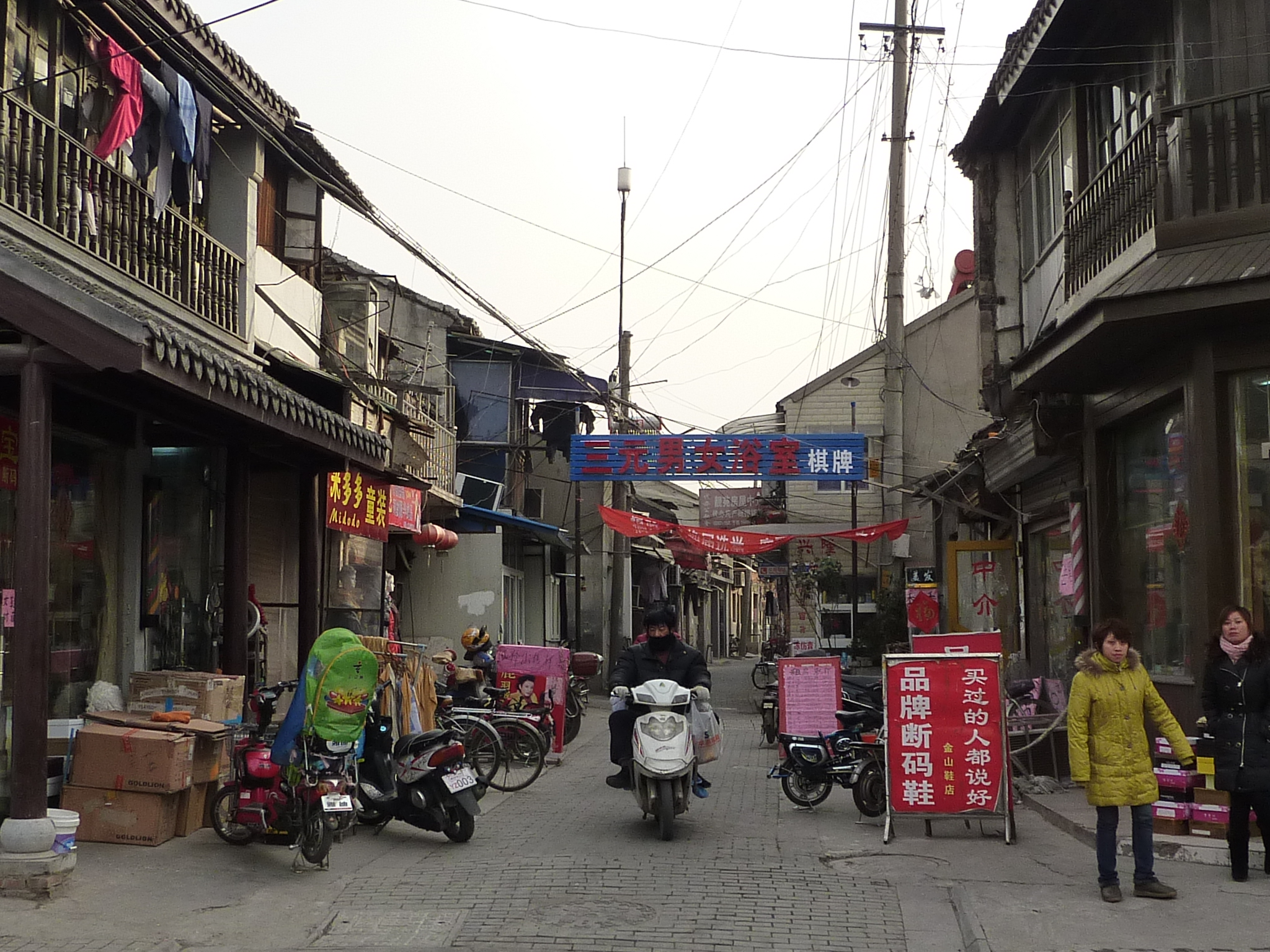
A small lane in Yangzhou's old city, with a sign across the street advertising "3 yuan men's and women's public showers" (三元男女浴室) and a chess room

The first reports of bathing in Yangzhou originated before 200 BC. In Yangzhou, a city in Jiangsu Province in China, locals bathe by filling up pots with water. In ancient Yangzhou natives from the Han dynasty until the Tang dynasty bathed at home. Public baths were not available.

== History ==
According to the three knives of Yangzhou, written by Wang Xianxin, public bathhouses appeared in Yangzhou as early as the beginning of the 11th century AD, in the Northern Song Yuanfeng area.

During the Qing dynasty Yangzhou's bath industry greatly developed. Xu Ning Zhang opened the first public bathhouse in Yangzhou.

During the Chinese Communist Revolution, Yangzhou had 33 bathhouses. The number of bathhouses in Yangzhou then grew to more than 260. As of 2002, Yangzhou's bathhouse industry employed over 5,000 people. Its annual revenue exceeded 500 million yuan. In Yangzhou's main urban area alone, bathhouses serve around 30,000 customers every day.

== Cultural significance ==
The people of Yangzhou bathe for health benefits and as a symbol of their culture and civilization. Bathing signifies their quality of life and a spirit of enjoyment. Contemporary bath centers have changed from places of relaxation to serving communities. There are spacious bathing areas along with various kinds of cultural bathing facilities throughout Yangzhou. This allows visitors to enjoy physical and mental relaxation along with pleasure, combined with soft lighting and elegant decor.

== Use outside Yangzhou ==
Many bathhouses in China name themselves as "Yangzhou bathhouse", although most of them are not true to their names. In an authentic Yangzhou bathhouse, attendants call their customers "boss", then hand each of them a hot towel and lead them to their seats. They also give them a cup of hot green tea. After guests disrobe, waiters use a clothes pole to put their clothes in a pile, which is raised about 3 meters off the ground to ensure the safety of the customers’ money and other valuables. In order to avoid catching a cold, guests are given a large towel in the water. Workers in the pool help guests bathe. When the clients get out of the water, waiters use six warm towels to dry their bodies, heads, face, legs and feet. The use eight movements to perform this—padding, cabling, carrying, rolling, dipping, dropping, twisting, and squeezing—are quick and effective. After the drying off, waiters bid their guests farewell.

== See also ==
- Chinese bathhouses
- Thermae: Roman baths
- List of hot springs
