= Stony Brook University =

Public university in Stony Brook, New York, US

State University of New York at Stony Brook
- Former names: State University College on Long Island (1957–1962)
- Type: Public research university center
- Established: September 16, 1957; 69 years ago
- Parent institution: State University of New York
- Accreditation: MSCHE
- Academic affiliations: AAU; URA; USU; sea-grant; space-grant
- Endowment: $1 billion (May 2026)
- Chancellor: John B. King Jr.
- President: Andrea Goldsmith
- Provost: Carl W. Lejuez
- Students: 27,252 (fall 2025)
- Undergraduates: 18,632 (fall 2025)
- Postgraduates: 8,620 (fall 2025)
- Location: Stony Brook, New York, United States; 40.917°N 73.124°W
- Campus: 1,454 acres (588 ha); Large suburb
- Other campuses: New York City; Southampton; Songdo
- Newspaper: The Statesman
- Colors: Red and black
- Nickname: Seawolves
- Sporting affiliations: NCAA Division I FCS – CAA; CAA Football
- Mascot: Wolfie the Seawolf
- Website: www.stonybrook.edu

The State University of New York at Stony Brook, commonly referred to as Stony Brook University (SBU), is a public research university in Stony Brook, New York, United States, on Long Island. Along with the University at Buffalo, it is one of the State University of New York system's two flagship institutions. Its campus consists of 213 buildings on over 1,454 acres (588 hectares) of land in Suffolk County and it is the largest public university (by area) in the state of New York.

Opened 69 years ago in 1957 in Oyster Bay as the State University College on Long Island, the institution moved to Stony Brook in 1962. Stony Brook is part of the Association of American Universities and the Universities Research Association. It is classified among "R1: Doctoral Universities – Very high research activity".

Stony Brook University, in partnership with Battelle, manages Brookhaven National Laboratory, a national laboratory of the United States Department of Energy. The university acquired land for a Research & Development Park adjacent to its main campus in 2004, and has four business incubators across the region. Stony Brook is the largest single-site employer on Long Island; over 25,500 students are enrolled at the university, which has over 15,000 employees and over 2,850 faculty.

Stony Brook is a member of the Coastal Athletic Association, and its intercollegiate athletic teams have competed at the Division I level of the National Collegiate Athletic Association (NCAA) since 1999.

== History ==
=== Origins in Oyster Bay ===
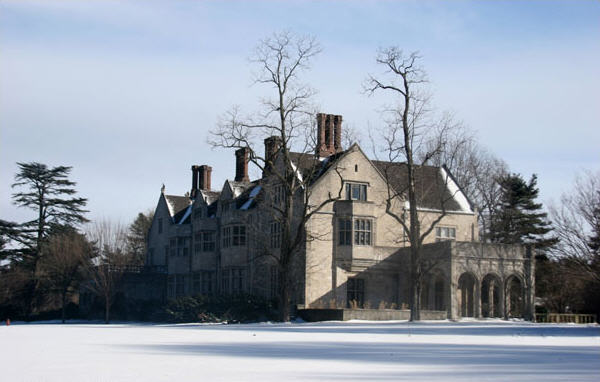
Coe Hall on the original Oyster Bay campus (used 1957–1964)

The State University of New York at Stony Brook was established in Oyster Bay in 1957, as the State University College on Long Island (SUCOLI). Established almost a decade after the creation of New York's public higher education system, the institution was envisioned as a college for the preparation of secondary school teachers.

Leonard K. Olson was appointed as the first dean of the institution and was instrumental in the recruitment of faculty staff and planning of the later Stony Brook campus. SUCOLI opened with an inaugural class of 148 students, on the grounds of the William Robertson Coe Planting Fields estate. These first students were admitted on a tuition-free basis.

1961 was a year of firsts as 30 students were conferred degrees in the first commencement and the university was appointed its first president, John Francis Lee. Lee left later that year due to political and bureaucratic matters regarding the future of the university and the central administration at Albany. Nevertheless, he had fulfilled his primary task of reshaping the university from a technical science and engineering college of limited degree options to a full-scale university featuring liberal arts programs.

=== Move to Stony Brook ===
In 1960 the Heald Report, commissioned by Governor Nelson Rockefeller, recommended a major new public university be built on Long Island to "stand with the finest in the country," a report that would ultimately shape most of the university's growth for years to come.

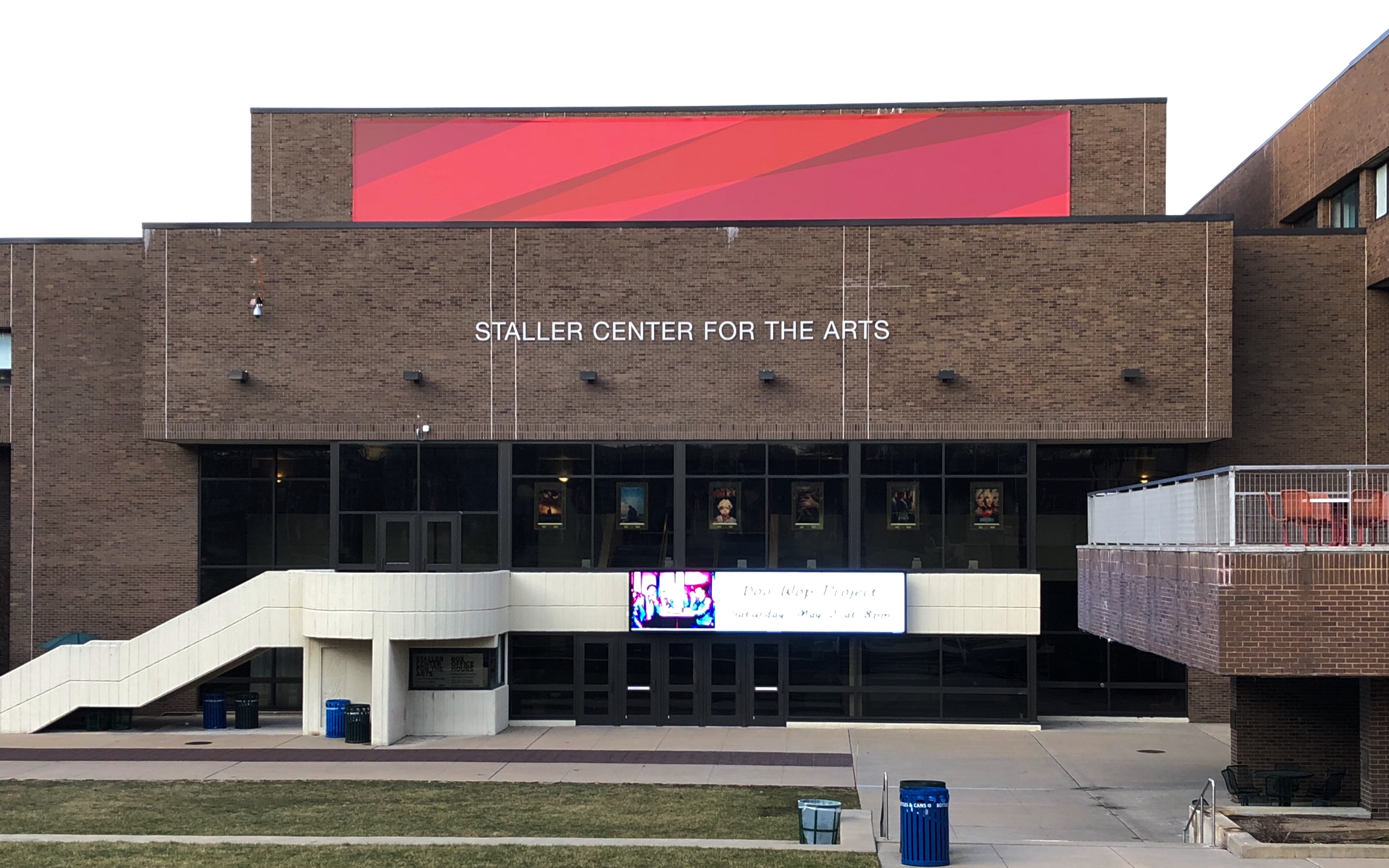
The Staller Center for the Arts on the Stony Brook campus

Ward Melville, a philanthropist and businessman from the Three Village area in western Suffolk County donated over 400 acres (160 hectares) of land to the state for the development of a state university and in 1962 the institution relocated to Stony Brook and officially renamed as the State University of New York at Stony Brook. However, the longer name has fallen out of favor; since 2005, it has usually been called simply Stony Brook University (SBU).

The campus had 782 students enrolled in 1962, but enrollment had increased more than tenfold by 1969, surpassing the 8,000 mark, fueled by the large funding of public higher education in the Sputnik era. In 1963, only three years after the release of the Heald Report, the Governor commissioned the "Education of Health Professions" (Muir Report) report. The report outlined the need for expansion of the university system to prepare medical professionals for the future needs of the state. The report was particularly important for Stony Brook as it recommended creation of a Health Sciences Center and academic hospital at the campus to serve the need of the fastest-growing counties (Nassau and Suffolk) in New York at the time.

=== Growth ===
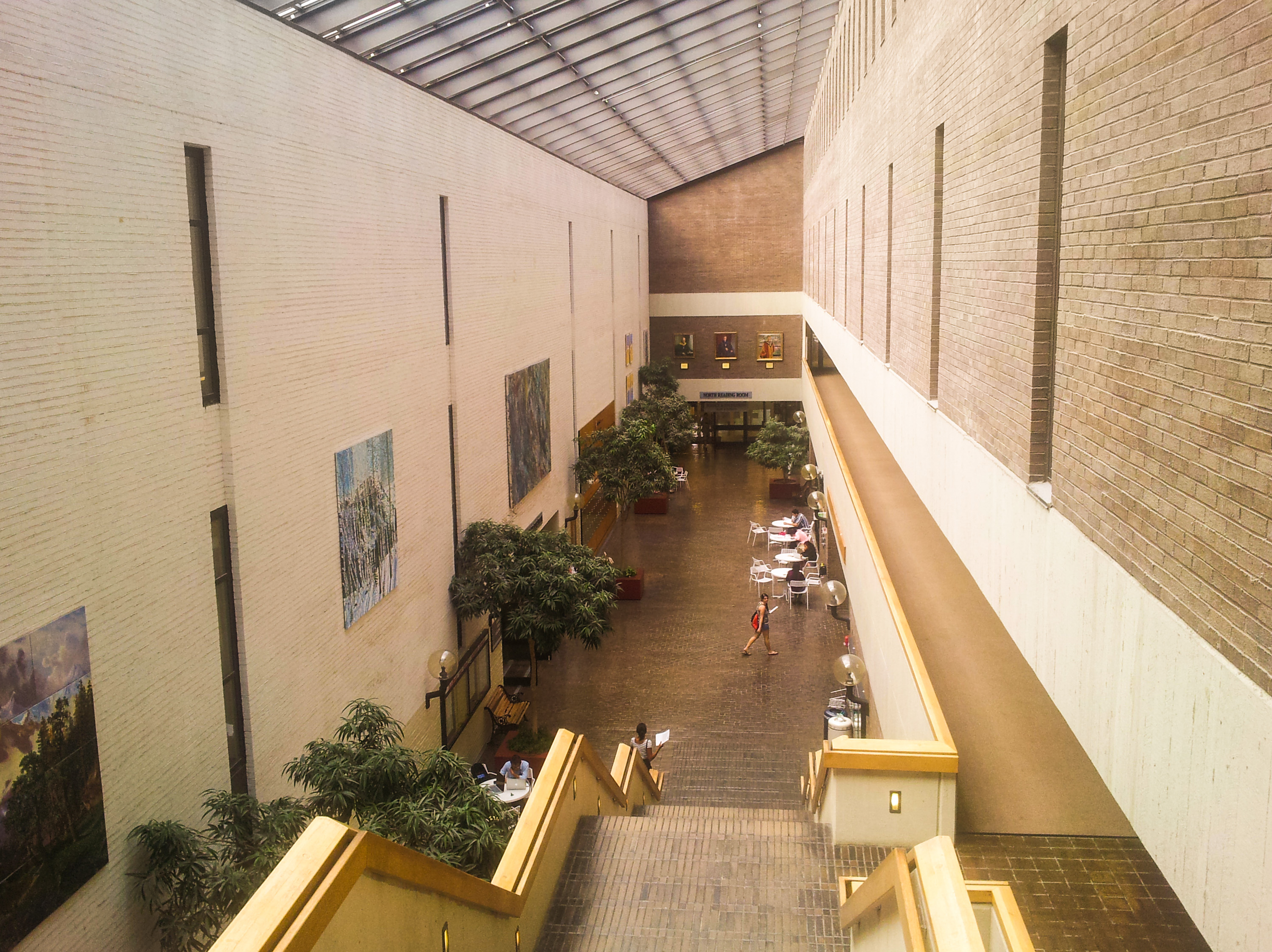
Atrium of the Frank Melville Jr. Memorial Library

In 1965, the State University appointed John S. Toll, a physicist from the University of Maryland as the second president of Stony Brook. In 1966, the university set forth initial timetables for the development of the Health Sciences Center, which would house the university's health programs and hospital. Despite the budgetary concerns and challenges from Albany, the university released a formalized plan early in 1968 and funding for recruitment of faculty was provided. At the same time, residential housing was expanded to 3,000, the Stony Brook Union opened in 1970, and in 1971, the massive expansion project for the campus library (named in memory of Frank Melville Jr., father of philanthropist Ward Melville) was completed.

Despite the fast-paced growth, campus infrastructure often struggled to keep pace: overcrowding, expansion, landscaping, lighting, and safety were persistent problems at the university, which led to multiple protests and growing tension between the student body and the administration. In January 1968, the "Operation Stony Brook" drug raid resulted in the arrest of 29 students, and late that year, tension climaxed as the administration and students decided on a three-day moratorium to bring together the entire university with the goal of improving communication between the students, faculty, and administration.

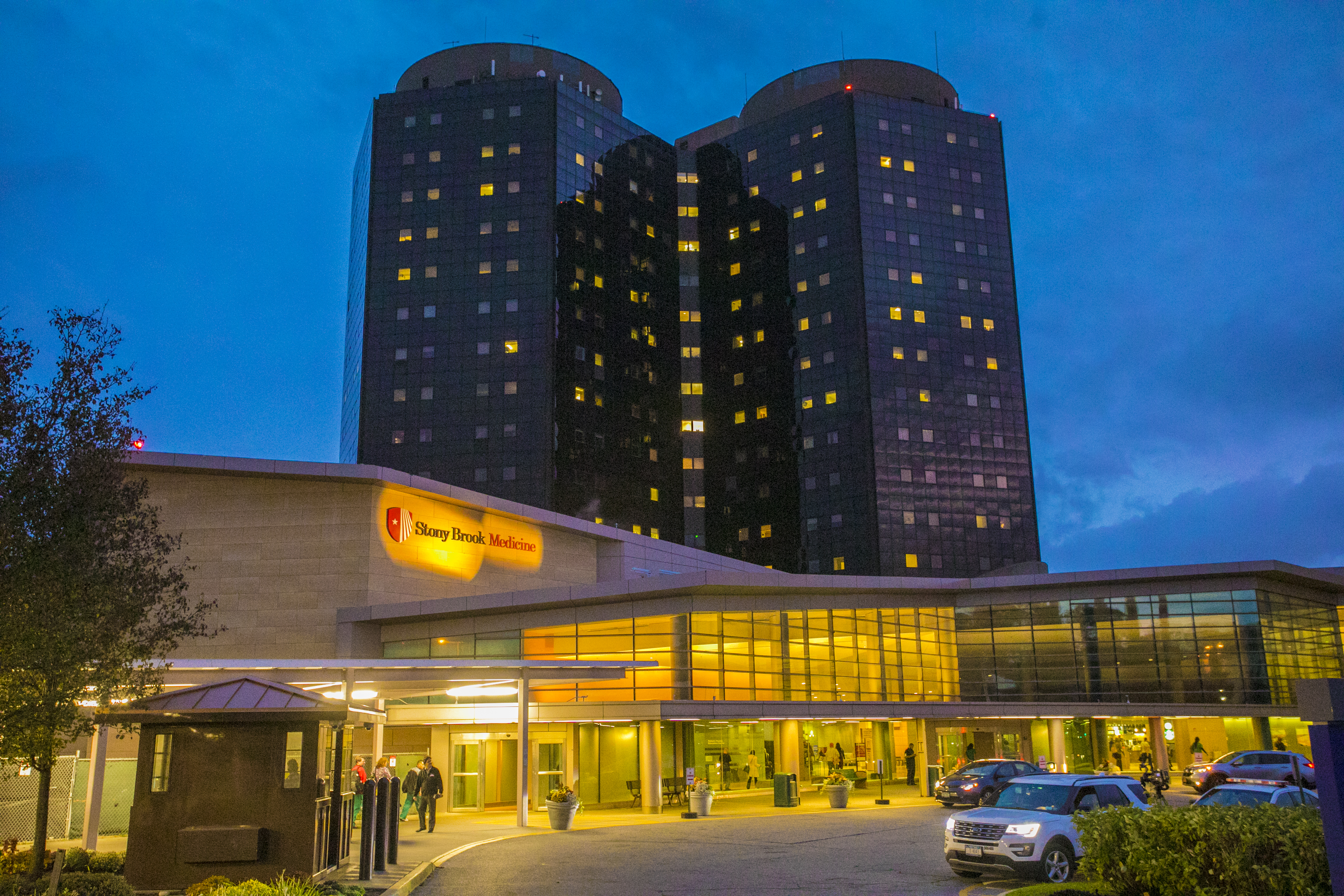
Stony Brook University Hospital, located on the east side of campus and attached to the Health Sciences Center

The 1970s witnessed the growth of the university and its transformation as a major research institution within New York's public school system, with strong graduate programs and scientific breakthroughs like the development of magnetic resonance imaging. However, the university lagged significantly in undergraduate education, prioritizing graduate education and research over undergraduate studies and student life. By 1975, enrollment had reached 16,000 and expansion crossed over Nicolls Road with the construction of the Health Sciences Center, which would be completed in 1980.

In 1981, John Marburger was inaugurated as the third president, and continued the expansion. By the late 1980s, the administration affirmed the need to improve other areas of the institution, which included undergraduate education, student and residential life, and intercollegiate athletics. In 1994, the university approved a decision to transition athletics to the Division I of the NCAA by 1999 and followed with the construction of the Stony Brook Arena and the expansion of the Indoor Sports Complex.

=== Further expansion into the 21st century ===
The 1990s affirmed Stony Brook's success at building a research university with a strong undergraduate education. Under the leadership of its fourth president, Shirley Strum Kenny, the administration sought out to showcase the value of the institution. Kenny was responsible for campus wide improvement projects, which included large-scale landscaping, renovations of every residence hall, the continued growth of the athletics programs, the improvement of student life, ever-increasing research expenditures, a branding/marketing campaign, and the university's increasing ties with private philanthropy.

In the mid-1990s, the school began to distance itself from the SUNY system, as Kenny believed that the SUNY name was hurting the school's reputation.

In 1998, the university became one of the top 100 American research universities in the U.S. News & World Report. That same year, the university and Battelle Memorial Institute were chosen by the Department of Energy as joint operators of the Brookhaven National Laboratory, joining a selective group of universities that operate national laboratories across the nation. Enrollment reached the 20,000 mark in 2001, and the administration's improvement efforts climaxed with the invitation to the highly selective Association of American Universities, an organization of North American universities committed to a strong system of research and education.

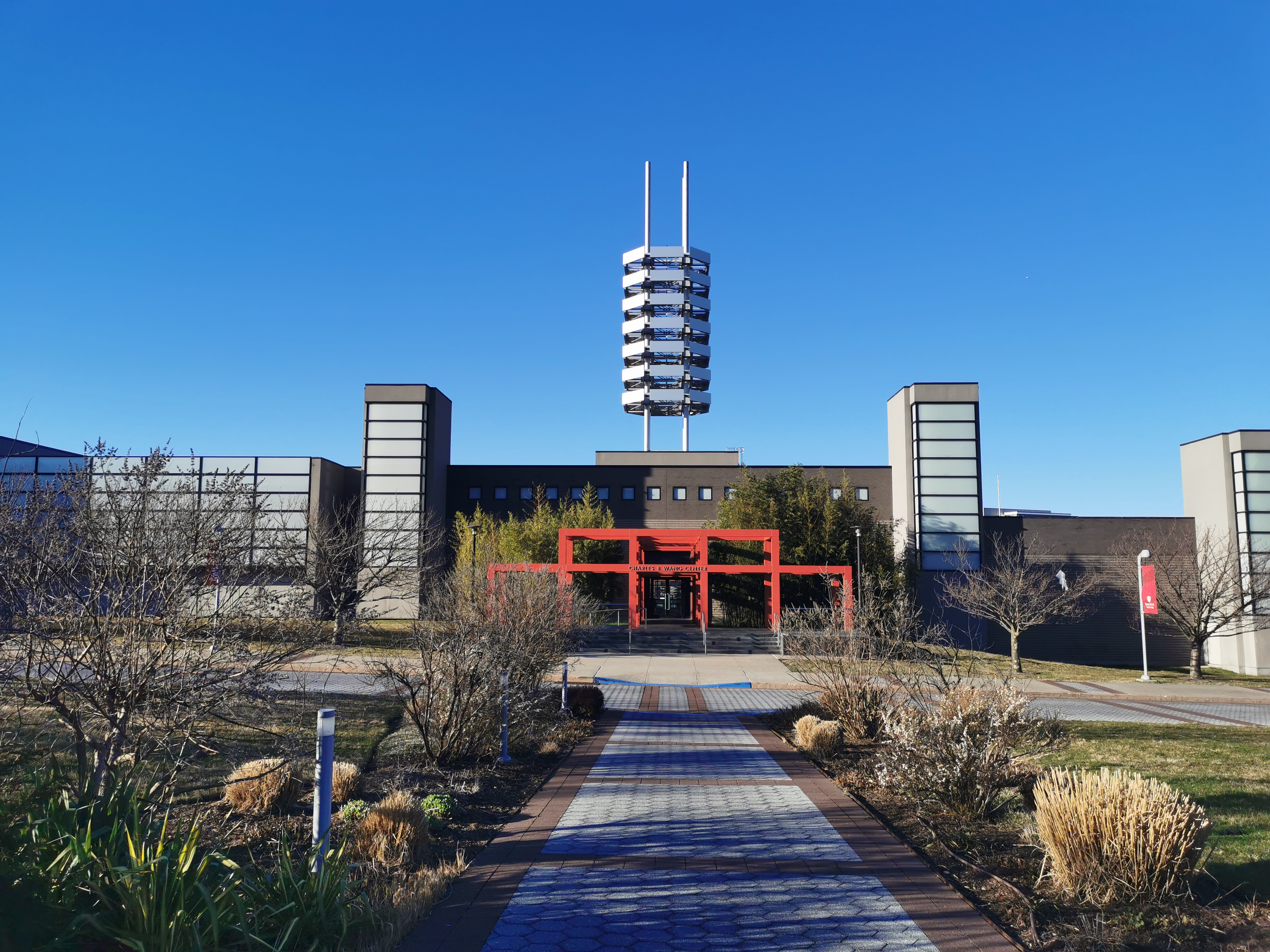
The Charles B. Wang Center is dedicated to Asian and American cultural studies.

2002 saw the opening of the $22 million Kenneth P. LaValle Stadium and the inauguration of the massive Charles B. Wang Center dedicated to Asian and American culture, funded by a $50 million donation from Charles B. Wang. At the time, it was the largest private donation to a SUNY institution. In 2003, chemistry professor Paul Lauterbur received a Nobel Prize in Physiology or Medicine for his research and discovery of Nuclear Magnetic Resonance, which was instrumental in the development of NMR Imaging (MRI) while at Stony Brook. In 2005, the university bought the Flowerfield property adjacent to campus through eminent domain as land for the development of a Research and Development Park. Plans for a law school were in the talks but scrapped shortly after.

In 2009, president Shirley Strum Kenny stepped down, and in May, Samuel L. Stanley was announced as Stony Brook's fifth president. The late 2000s saw the university receive historic philanthropic donations. Hedge funder Jim Simons made multiple multi-million donations, including a $25 million donation to the Stony Brook Foundation in 2006, a $60 million donation for the development of the Simons Center for Geometry and Physics in 2008, and a landmark $150 million donation to the university in 2011. Other major donations were provided by alumni Joe Nathan, Stuart Goldstein, and Glenn Dubin for major renovation of athletic facilities. In 2010, Stanley announced Project 50 Forward, a comprehensive plan for the development of the university in the next 50 years with a focus on "operational excellence, academic greatness, and building for the future."

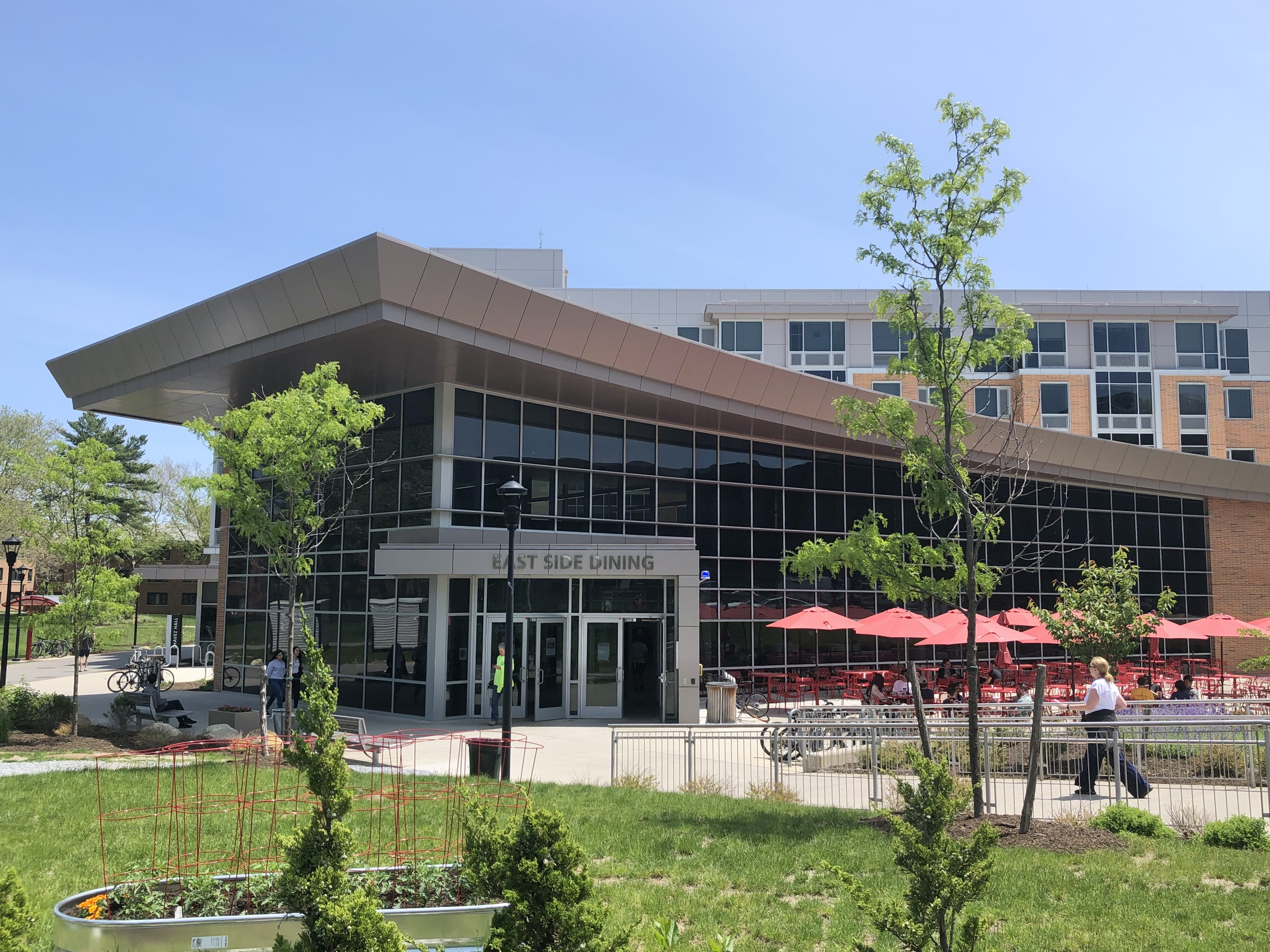
East Side dining facility attached to Chavez and Tubman residence halls

In 2012, the $40 million Walter J. Hawrys Campus Recreation Center opened, soon followed by the on-campus Hilton Garden Inn in May 2013. Frey Hall, named after alumnus Robert Frey, opened in 2013 after undergoing renovations as the former Old Chemistry building. The Stony Brook University Arena underwent a $21 million overhaul, re-opening as the Island Federal Arena in 2014. In July 2015, a new $40.8 million Computer Science building opened, spanning 70,000 square feet (6,500 m^{2}). New dormitories, known as Chavez Hall and Tubman Hall, along with a new East Side dining hall, opened in the fall of 2016. In January 2019, Stony Brook Medicine opened their $194 million cancer center to the public.

President Stanley left Stony Brook effective August 1, 2019, to become the president of Michigan State University following the Larry Nassar scandal. Provost Michael A. Bernstein was named interim president in his place. On March 26, 2020, Maurie McInnis, the executive vice president and provost of the University of Texas, was named the sixth president of Stony Brook, effective July 1, 2020.

During the COVID-19 pandemic, the United States Army constructed $50 million temporary field hospitals on the campus of Stony Brook University. However, the beds were dismantled in 2021 without ever being used. A $63.4 million renovation of the Stony Brook Union was completed during the pandemic and opened in 2020.

=== Flagship status era ===
On January 5, 2022, New York Governor Kathy Hochul officially designated Stony Brook University and the University at Buffalo as the two flagship universities of the State University of New York system. The announcement came with the dedication of a new $100 million multidisciplinary engineering building. About three weeks later, Stony Brook announced its departure from the America East Conference after 21 years to the Colonial Athletic Association, effective July 1, 2022. Later that year, distinguished professor Dennis Sullivan earned the 2022 Abel Prize, the top honor in mathematics.

In the 2022–23 edition of the U.S. News & World Report national college rankings, Stony Brook was ranked 77th, its highest-ever placement, as well as the first time that Stony Brook held sole possession of the highest-ranked public university in New York. It advanced to 58th the following year.

In April 2023, Stony Brook University was selected as the anchor institution for a new $700 million, 172-acre climate change research and education hub on Governors Island in New York City, set to open in 2028. Two months later, the university received a $500 million unrestricted gift from the Simons Foundation, the second-largest gift to a public university in U.S. history. McInnis stepped down in May 2024 to become the president at Yale University, and former Rutgers president Richard L. McCormick was named interim president. In February 2025, Princeton dean of engineering and applied science Andrea Goldsmith was named SBU's seventh president.

== Campuses ==
=== Main campus ===
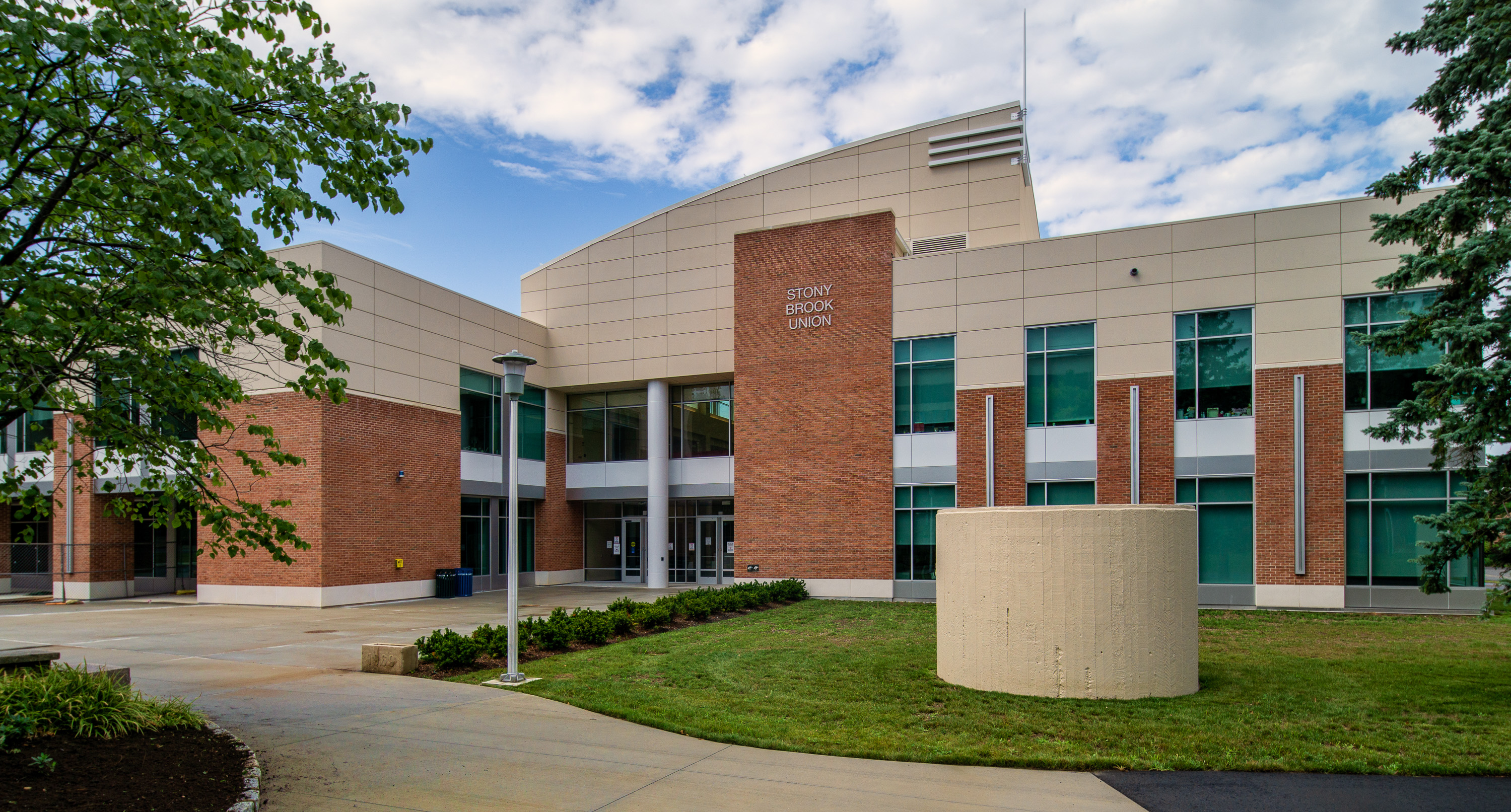
Stony Brook Union

The main campus is in the area of the historic North Shore hamlet of Stony Brook near the geographic midpoint of Long Island, approximately 50 miles (80 km) east of Manhattan and 62 miles (100 km) west of Montauk. Bounded to the north by New York State Route 25A (North Country Road), the campus is subdivided into "West Campus" and "East Campus" by the thoroughfare County Road 97 (Nicolls Road). The Ashley Schiff Forest Preserve separates the South Campus from West Campus. The Long Island Rail Road serves the community with the Stony Brook station situated along the northern edge of the campus.

The Stony Brook University campus area is a census-designated place (CDP), with a population of 10,409 at the 2020 census. As of the 2020 census, the U.S. Census Bureau defines the Stony Brook University CDP as a census-designated place separate from the CDP of Stony Brook.

The municipality containing the university is Town of Brookhaven. The university is not located in a village.

==== West ====
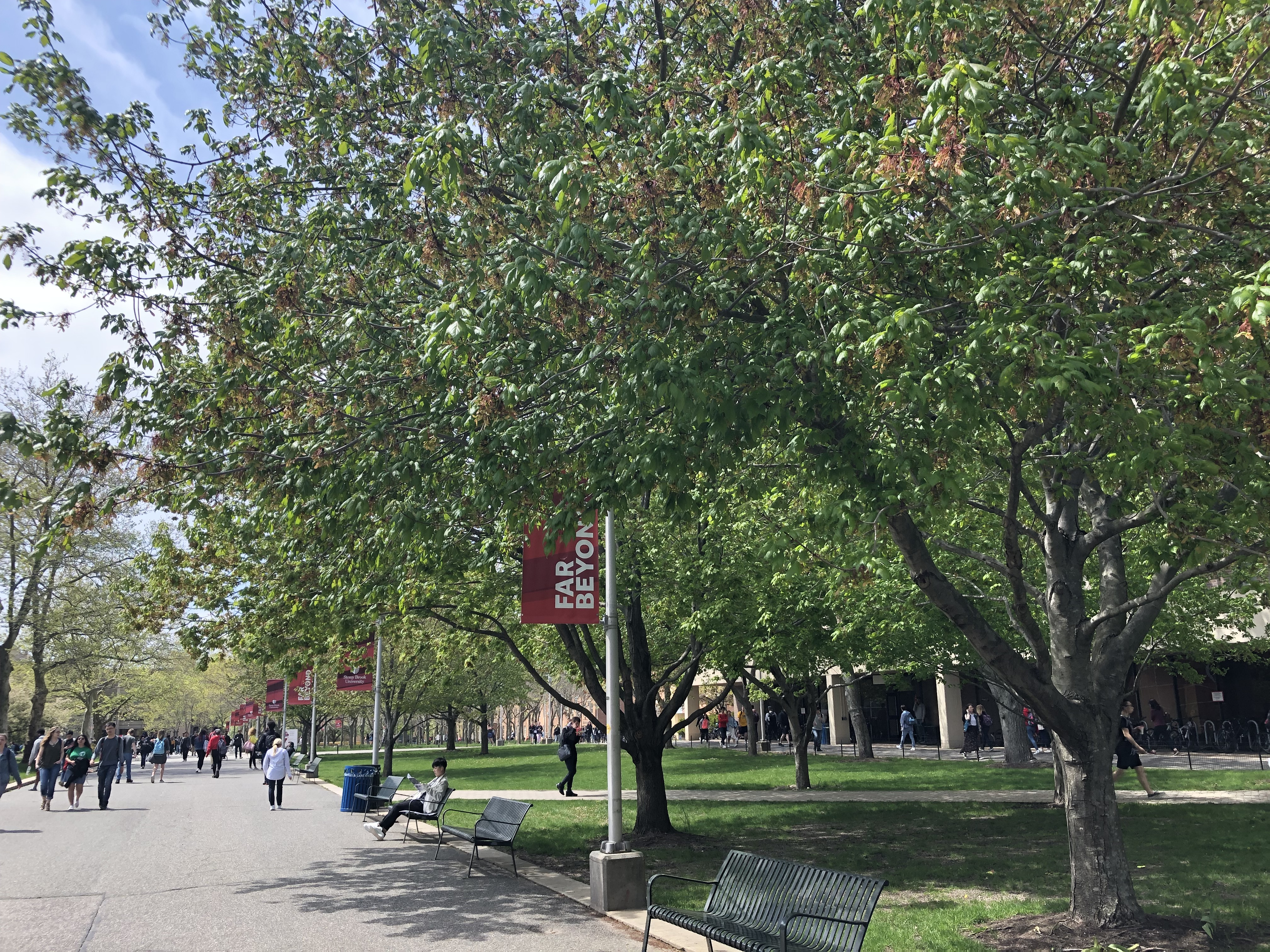
The Academic Mall is the central feature of West Campus.

The West Campus is the center of the academic life of the university. It houses the majority of academic, athletic, and undergraduate student housing facilities while also being the original site of the university.

The modern campus is centered around the Academic Mall, which stretches for more than a quarter of a mile from the Simons Center for Geometry and Physics at the west end to the Administration Building at the east end. The Academic Mall includes the Student Activities Center, Frank Melville Jr. Memorial Library, Staller Center for the Arts, Humanities building, Psychology A & B, Harriman Hall, Frey Hall (previously known as Old Chemistry), the Earth and Space Sciences building, Math Tower, and Physics building.

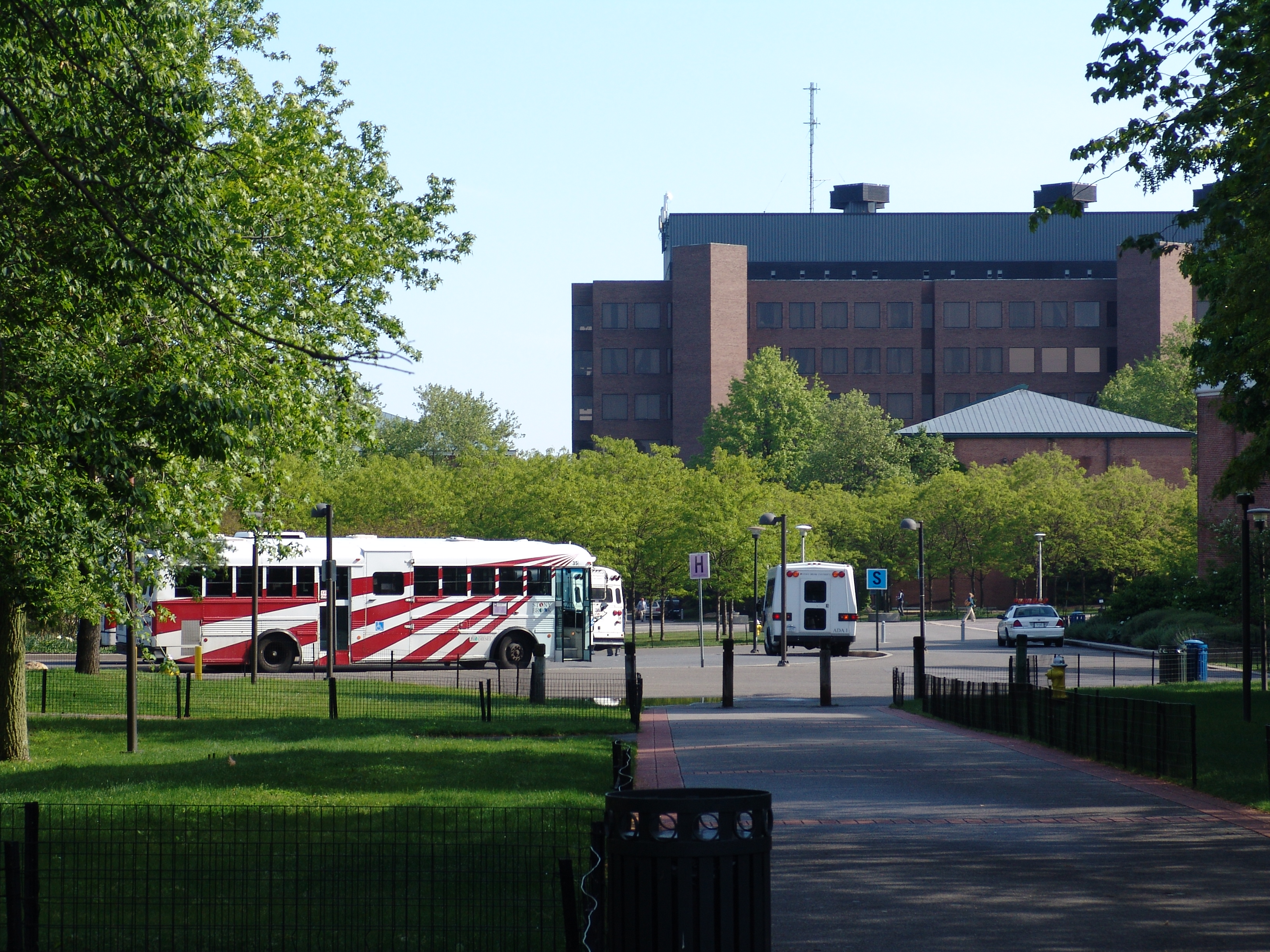
View toward the Chemistry Building

The Engineering Quad is located near the Academic Mall, and contains the Engineering, Light Engineering, Heavy Engineering, and Computing Center facilities. The Javits Lecture Center, Social and Behavioral Sciences building, Computer Science building, New Computer Science building and Student Union facilities are also on the West Campus. The Life Sciences complex, also on the West Campus, consists of the Life Sciences building, Laufer Center for Physical and Quantitative Biology, Centers for Molecular Medicine, Bioengineering building, and the Institute for Advanced Computational Science.

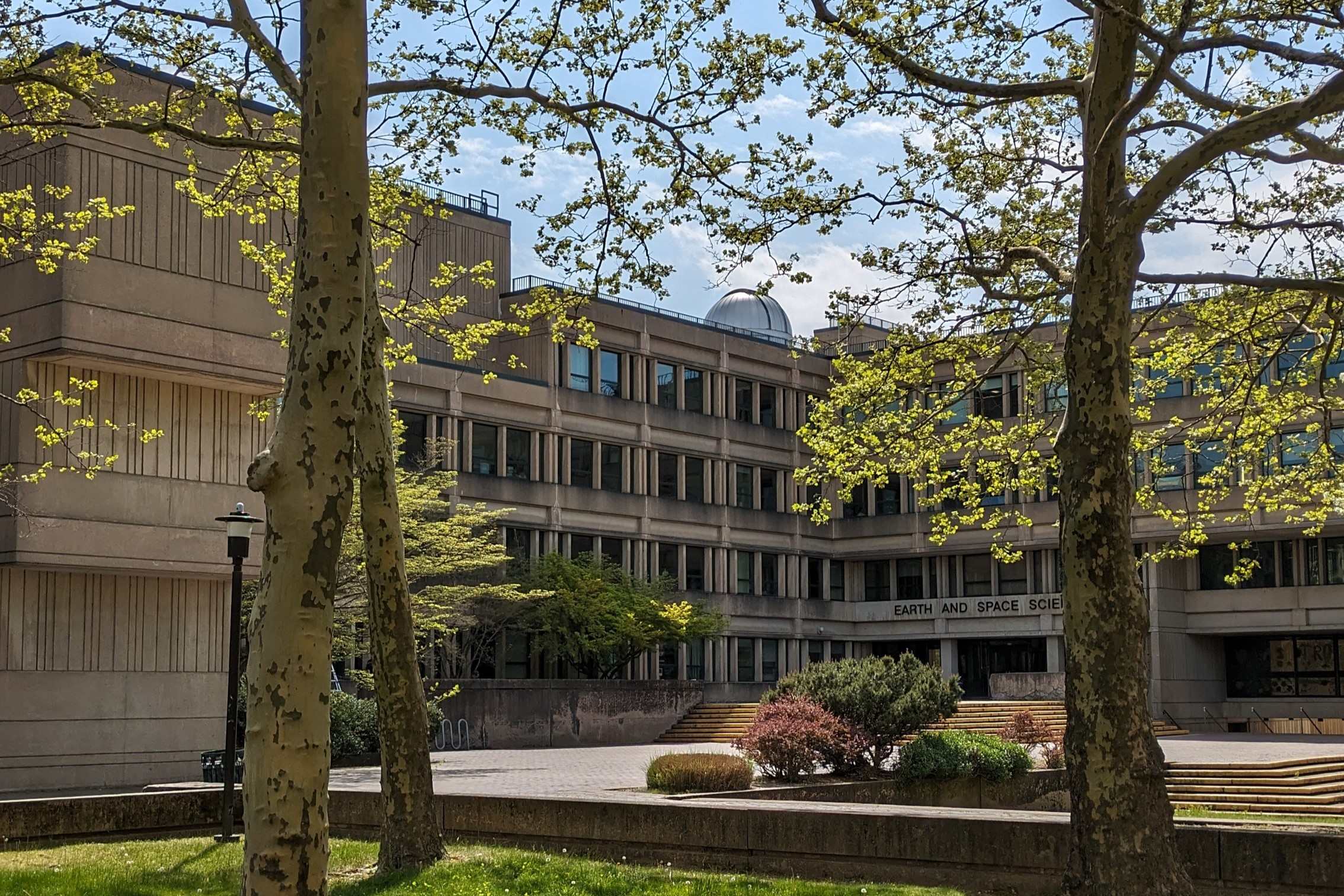
Earth and Space Sciences building

Among the latest additions to the campus are the Simons Center for Geometry and Physics, the new Walter J. Hawrys Campus Recreation Center, the Hilton Garden Inn hotel, Frey Hall, and a new Computer Science building. The Staller Center, which contains the largest movie screen in Suffolk County on Long Island, holds the annual Stony Brook Film Festival.

The athletic facilities are in the northwest quadrant of West Campus, which include the Stony Brook Sports Complex, Island Federal Credit Union Arena, Kenneth P. LaValle Stadium, Joe Nathan Field, University Track, and University Field.

==== South ====
The South Campus is about half a mile south of the Academic Mall and separated from West Campus by the Ashley Schiff Forest Preserve. It is home to the School of Dental Medicine, the School of Marine and Atmospheric Sciences (SoMAS), the Cody Center for Autism and Developmental Disabilities, and the University Police headquarters.

==== Research and development ====
The Research and Development Park is on Stony Brook Road, a mile from the center of campus. On November 3, 2005, the university announced it had formally acquired 246 acres (100 hectares) of the adjacent Flowerfield property, originally owned by the St. James Gyrodyne Company of America, through eminent domain, three years after the university had expressed its desire to acquire the property.

Stony Brook is using this property as a Research and Development Park, similar to other university-affiliated science parks around the country. The campus will ultimately house ten new buildings. The first building, the Center of Excellence in Wireless and Information Technology (CEWIT), was completed in October 2008. CEWIT houses the world's first (and currently the largest) immersive gigapixel facility in the world, called the Reality Deck. In 2019, Stony Brook University celebrated the opening of its new SMART Cluster in CEWIT, a dual-use GPU cluster for both machine learning and visualization. The SMART Cluster is also the first hardware-accelerated ray-tracing cluster for real-time cinematic quality rendering, allowing scientists, engineers and physicians to visualize huge amounts of data in a new way. Construction for the Advanced Energy Research and Technology Center, designed by Flad Architects, commenced in the summer of 2008 and opened in the spring of 2010.

==== East ====
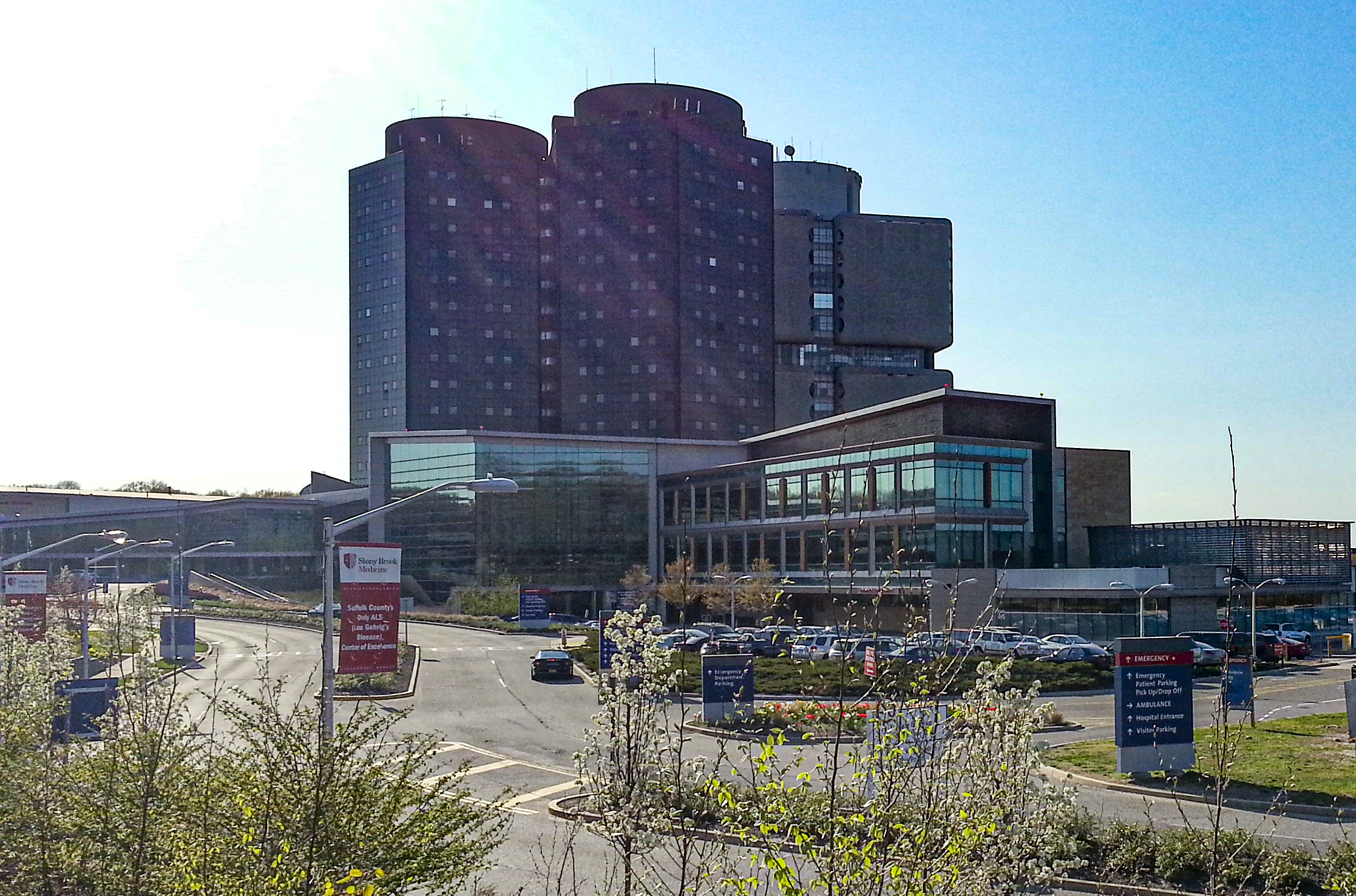
Stony Brook University Hospital at the East Campus

The East Campus is separated from the main campus by Nicolls Road (County Road 97). It is home to the Stony Brook University Hospital and the Health Sciences Center. Stony Brook University Hospital, completed in 1980, is Suffolk County's only tertiary hospital and Level 1 Trauma Center, and the only academic medical center in Suffolk County—larger also than any in Nassau County. The hospital is the largest in Suffolk County, and the attached Health Sciences Center (HSC) and Basic Science Tower (BST) houses numerous laboratories, the School of Medicine (1972), the School of Nursing (1970), the School of Health Professions (1970) and the School of Social Welfare (1971). The area also includes the Ambulatory Surgery Center and the Center for Outpatient Services.

Construction on the Medical and Research Translation (MART) building began in November 2013, and the 240,000 square foot building opened on November 1, 2018, with its $194 million cost funded by state grants and donations from Jim Simons. The MART building is the home to the Stony Brook Cancer Center. In November 2019, Stony Brook Medicine opened a four-story, $73 million expansion to the Stony Brook Children's Hospital.

Also in the east side of campus are the Chapin apartments, which provide housing for graduate students. The Long Island High Technology Incubator, one of the four business incubators of the university, is a short walk north of the hospital. The Long Island State Veterans Home serving the Long Island veteran community is in this part of campus.

=== Manhattan campus ===
In 2002, the university established a presence in Manhattan with the opening of Stony Brook Manhattan. The original site was at 401 Park Avenue South; a newer operation opened in late 2008 in the adjacent building on the third floor of 387 Park Avenue South. The university consolidated operations in 2011 to just the 3rd floor of 387 Park Avenue South, with a classroom entrance around the corner at 101 East 27th Street. The 18,000-square-foot (1,700 m^{2}) site allows Stony Brook to offer professional and graduate courses targeted towards students in New York City; undergraduate courses are held primarily during the summer and winter sessions. Conferences and special events take place throughout the year. In February 2017 however, the lease for this campus was terminated, and there are no classes offered at this location.

=== Southampton campus ===
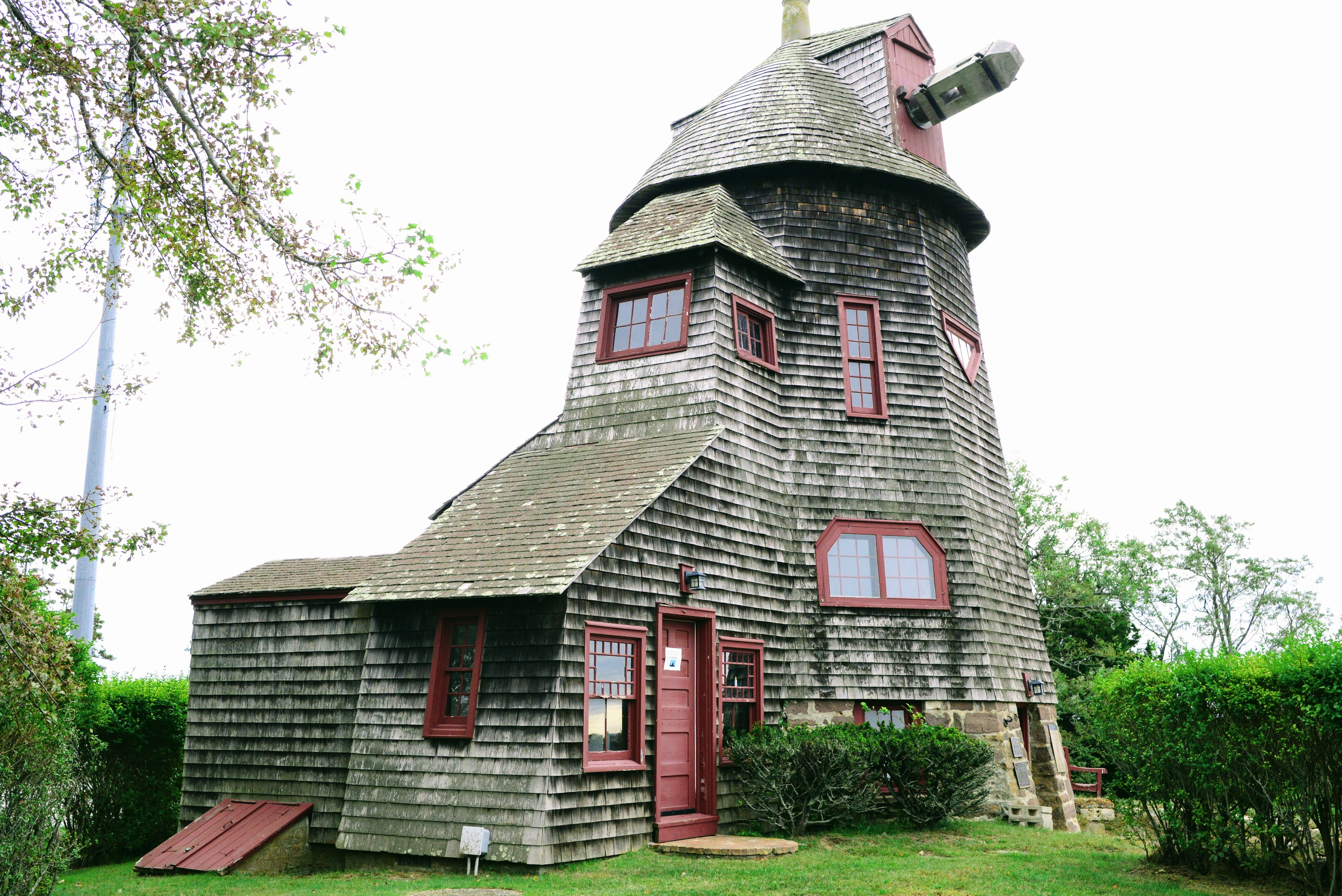
The Southampton Windmill is a prominent feature of the Southampton campus.

On March 24, 2006, the university completed the purchase of the 81-acre (33-hectare) Southampton College (on the east end of Long Island) property from Long Island University with the intent to develop it as a full college campus focusing on academic programs related to the environment and sustainability. Stony Brook expanded its original program, started in Fall 2005, when it offered an undergraduate marine sciences program, with teaching and research facilities at the campus leased from Long Island University. An enrollment of about 2,000 students is expected within the next five years. Professor Martin Schoonen was appointed interim dean of Southampton campus on August 3, 2006, and conservationist Mary Pearl was appointed dean and vice president in March 2009.

On April 7, 2010, the university had suspended residential programs and transferred sustainability programs to the main campus. The change was prompted by severe state budget cuts. Although the Marine Sciences and Graduate Writing programs are still in session at Southampton, undergraduates were relocated to the main campus. As a result of the suspension of residential programs, all dining services and retail operations were suspended by the Faculty Student Association. The old LIU radio station and National Public Radio affiliate no longer operate on the campus.

In September 2011, Stony Brook Southampton began offering an undergraduate program called Semester by the Sea, where students attend undergraduate classes to study the ocean or the arts. Students studying the ocean are immersed in marine topics that are enhanced with close proximity to the water, a fleet of research vessels and graduate research projects that are ongoing. Students studying the arts are engaged in studies for filmmaking and creative writing. Both programs offer a Public Lecture Series.

As of 2015, the Stony Brook Southampton campus has shown growth, despite almost being closed down in 2010. Programs had been added back, and the board of trustees of the State University of New York approved a long-awaited partnership agreement between Southampton and Stony Brook University hospitals. Enrollment increased to over 400, after being around 175, three years following the addition of new funding.

As of 2019, Stony Brook University operates the Stony Brook Southampton Hospital with plans to take ownership of more eastern Long Island hospitals.

=== Art on campus ===
Stony Brook University has four gallery spaces on campus. As was the desire of donor Paul W. Zuccaire, the Paul W. Zuccaire Gallery, formerly known as the University Art Gallery, showcases professional exhibitions as well as annual graduate and undergraduate student works. The Paul W. Zuccaire Gallery is in the Staller Center for the Arts.

Also on campus is the Latin American and Caribbean Studies Center's Art Gallery, which features works from Latino and Latin American artists as well as local artists who fall under that category. The SAC Art Gallery is a center for interactive and participatory art projects.

The Tabler Center for Arts, Culture, and Humanities includes an art gallery and blackbox theater performance space. The Simons Center for Geometry and Physics includes an art gallery as well.

=== South Korea campus ===
Stony Brook University offers degree programs in South Korea through SUNY Korea, located at the Incheon Global Campus in Songdo, Incheon. The establishment of SUNY Korea was approved by South Korea’s Ministry of Education, Science and Technology in 2011. Academic programs began in March 2012 with graduate programs in computer science and technology and society, followed by the introduction of undergraduate programs in March 2013.

SUNY Korea Campus at Incheon, Korea

Stony Brook’s academic offerings at SUNY Korea include undergraduate programs in applied mathematics and statistics, business management, computer science, electrical engineering, mechanical engineering, and technological systems management. Master’s and doctoral programs are also offered, with availability varying by field.

Students enrolled in Stony Brook’s undergraduate programs at SUNY Korea are required to spend one academic year at Stony Brook’s New York campus, over two consecutive semesters. Stony Brook also offers study abroad opportunities at SUNY Korea for students based in New York.

In August 2017, the Fashion Institute of Technology began offering programs at SUNY Korea alongside Stony Brook. The programs in Fashion Design and Fashion Business Management are offered as Associate in Applied Science degree programs.

SUNY Korea is part of the Incheon Global Campus, which also includes George Mason University Korea, the University of Utah Asia Campus, and Ghent University Global Campus. SUNY Korea has more than 1,400 students, with students from more than 70 countries. Arthur H. Lee has served as president of SUNY Korea since January 1, 2022.

== Organization and administration ==
College/school founding
College/school	Year founded
College of Arts and Sciences	1990
College of Business	2004
College of Engineering and Applied Sciences	1960
School of Dental Medicine	1968
School of Health Professions	-
School of Journalism	2006
School of Marine & Atmospheric Sciences	2007
School of Nursing	-
School of Medicine	1980
School of Professional Development	-
School of Social Welfare	1970
The Graduate School	-

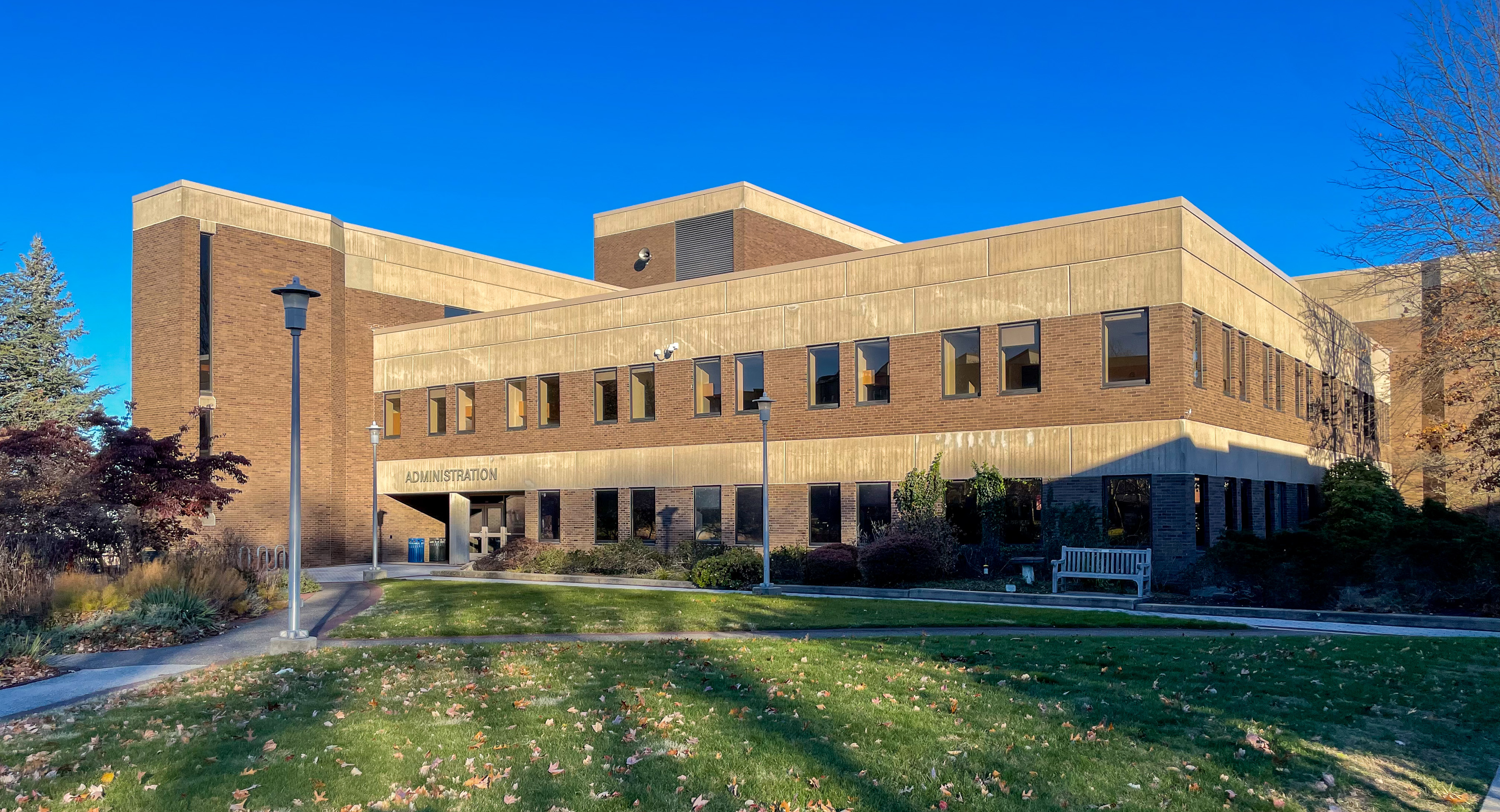
Administration Building

The Stony Brook University consists of a main campus in Stony Brook, and additional satellite campuses in Southampton, New York, and South Korea. The university is composed of 12 schools and colleges. By enrollment, the largest college or school is the College of Arts and Sciences.

The university is governed by the State University of New York board of trustees, a body of 18 members, which regulate all the individual units of the SUNY system. The trustees have the authority to appoint the president of each state-operated institution; grant all degree diplomas and certificates for the completion of studies at any state-operated campus; and regulate admissions, tuition, curricula, and all other matters pertaining to the operation and administration of each state-operated campus. The president of Stony Brook is the principal executive officer of the university. The position was first held by John Francis Lee and is held by the seventh president in the institution's history, Andrea Goldsmith, who took office on August 1, 2025.

=== Endowment ===
Stony Brook's financial endowment is managed by the Stony Brook Foundation. The foundation was established in 1965 as a not-for-profit corporation under the New York State Education Law, chartered to collect and manage gifts from private and non-state resources to supplement the funding of the university and managed by a voluntary board of trustees. Donations can be made to a wide selection of funds which benefit different areas of the university.

In 2012, the endowment was valued at approximately $125 million with total assets amounting to nearly $350 million and has fully recovered from the losses endured in the 2008 economic downturn. After a strong fundraising campaign led by Jim Simon's $150 million donation, the university's fundraising amounted to more than $180 million for the 2011–12 year and raised $200 million by March 2013. It is the second largest endowment among State University of New York university centers behind the University at Buffalo. However, the university's endowment remains far below the average of its Association of American Universities peers.

On June 1, 2023, the Simons Foundation announced a historic $500 million endowment gift, making it the largest unrestricted donation to an institution of higher education in U.S. history.

=== Student government ===
Housed in the Student Activities Center, the Undergraduate Student Government (USG) is the governing body representing the undergraduate students of the university. The main functions of USG involve regulation, funding, and recognizing official clubs and organizations of the university. Undergraduate students are obligated to pay a Student Activity Fee per semester which is then administered by the Undergraduate Student Government. USG manages the yearly Homecoming events, Roth Pond Regatta and the traditional end-of-the year Brookfest concert and a series of concerts and events branded as "Stony Brook Concerts" that occur throughout the academic year while also directly funding undergraduate organizations, clubs, and other student services. USG at Stony Brook has a long history going back to the founding of the Student Polity Association (Polity) in 1959. After the controversial de-certification of Polity by the administration in 2002, USG was founded in 2003.

Like USG, the Graduate Student Organization (GSO) is the governing body representing the graduate students of the university. The GSO advocates for graduate student interests to senior university administration and is part of shared governance at the university. Graduate students pay a per-semester activity fee which is used to fund events and programs for the graduate community. The GSO provides services for graduate students including funding for conferences, seminars, speaker events, travel to Brookhaven and Cold Spring Harbor Laboratories, funding for social events, departmental organizations, and student clubs. The GSO hosts social events, professional development programming, and free legal and tax clinics. Traditional events hosted by the GSO include graduate student orientation, Three Minute Thesis, an annual speaker event, and national conferences. The GSO co-manages the University Cafe. GSO executive board members partake in national advocacy, and work with organizations such as the National Association of Graduate-Professional Students (NAGPS) on advocating for higher education policy issues.

== Academics ==
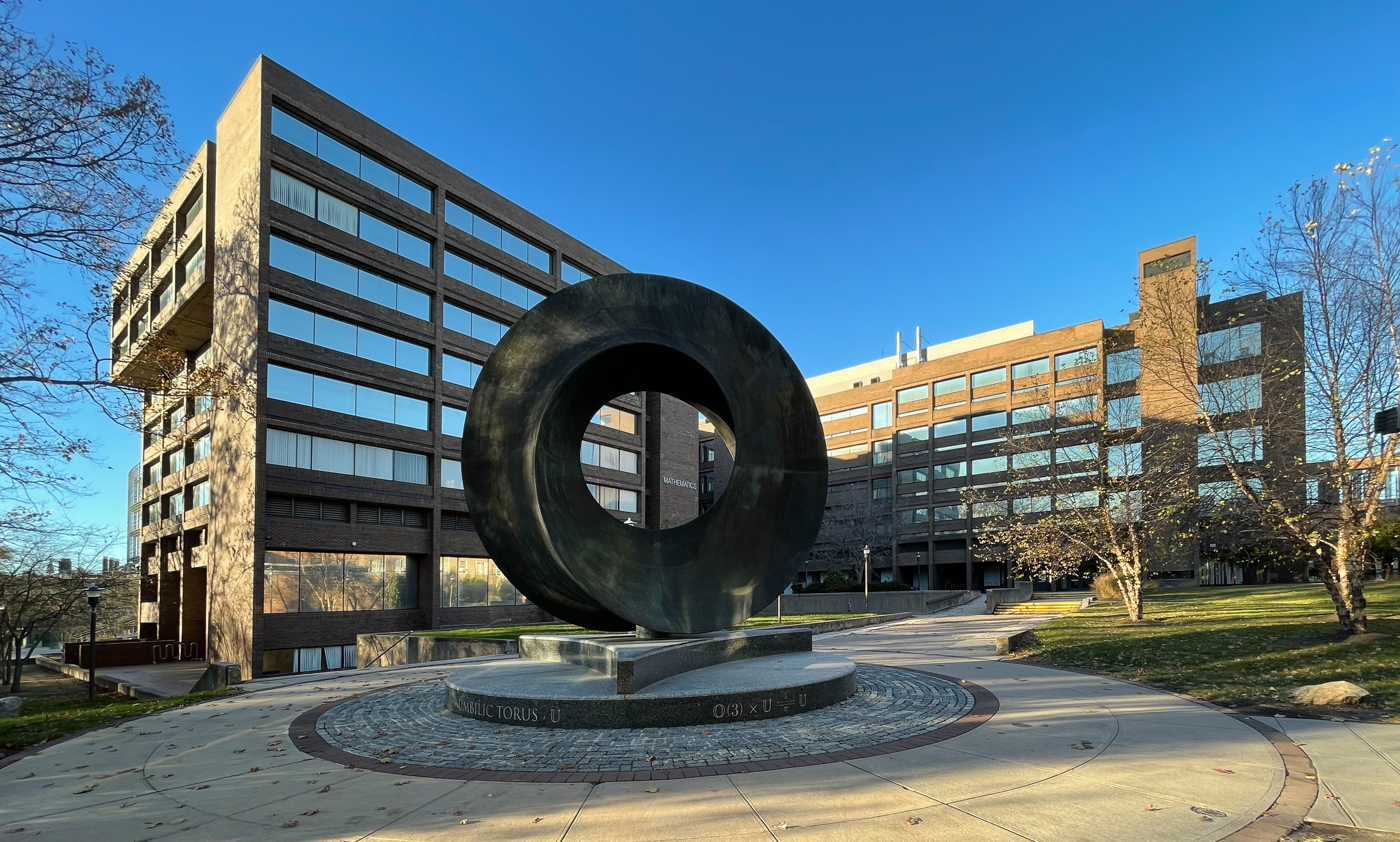
Umbilic Torus in front of the Math Tower and Physics building

Stony Brook was one of ten national universities awarded a National Science Foundation recognition award in 1998 for their integration of research and education. Between 2005 and 2007, two Nobel Prizes were awarded to professors for their work conducted at Stony Brook. The university has an annual $4.65 billion economic impact on the region. Stony Brook co-manages Brookhaven National Laboratory through Brookhaven Science Associates, a 50-50 partnership with Battelle Memorial Institute. Stony Brook is also one of two public schools in New York to have a medical school and a dental school, the other being University at Buffalo.

The university's health science and medical component, collectively referred to as Stony Brook Medicine, includes the Renaissance School of Medicine and the Schools of Dental Medicine, Nursing, Health Professions, Pharmacy and Pharmaceutical Sciences, and Social Welfare, as well as the Hospital, major centers and institutes, programs, clinics and community-based healthcare settings, and the Long Island State Veterans Home.

=== Tuition ===
For the 2021–22 academic year, annual undergraduate tuition and fees was $10,410 for in-state students and $28,080 for out-of-state students. Tuition alone cost $7,070 and $24,740, respectively, with $3,020 in fees. Average room and board cost is $14,884.

78% of full-time enrolled freshmen received financial aid, with an average of $13,100 per student. 71% of full-time enrolled freshmen received a scholarship or aid from a federal or state government institution. 42% of full-time enrolled freshmen received loan aid from the federal government at an average of $5,000 per student.

=== Undergraduate admissions ===
Undergraduate admissions statistics
- 2023 entering class
- Admit rate: 49.01% (▲ +7.03)
- Yield rate: 14.47% (▼ −6.83)

Test scores middle 50%^{[i]}
- SAT Total: 1330–1470 (among 36% of FTFs)
- ACT Composite: 28–33 (among 3% of FTFs)

High school GPA
- Average: 93.52

Admission to Stony Brook University is classified as "more selective" by the Carnegie Classification of Institutions of Higher Education. The Princeton Review gives Stony Brook an "Admissions Selectivity Rating" of 93.

In 2023, the university received 50,341 applications. It extended offers of admission to 24,670 applicants, or 49%, after holistic review that includes examination of academic rigor, performance and admissions test scores. 3,569 accepted students chose to enroll, a yield rate of 14.5%.

Stony Brook does not require applicants to submit a standardized test score. Of the 36% of incoming students in 2023 who submitted SAT scores, the interquartile range for math and reading was 680–770 and 640–720 respectively. Of the 3% of incoming students in 2023 who submitted ACT scores, the interquartile range was 28–33. Of all matriculating students, the average high school GPA is 93.52 on a 100-point scale.

=== Rankings and reputation ===
Academic rankings

National
- Forbes: 84
- U.S. News & World Report: 58
- Washington Monthly: 98
- WSJ/College Pulse: 98

Global
- ARWU: 151-200
- QS: =452
- THE: 279
- U.S. News & World Report: 230

In 2023, U.S. News & World Report ranked Stony Brook University 58th overall among national universities and 26th among public universities. In 2022, the QS US University Rankings ranked Stony Brook University as No. 39 in the US. In 2023, Stony Brook University was again ranked the top public university in New York.

In 2020, The Wall Street Journal ranked Stony Brook University tied with two others as the second-best public school in the Northeastern United States.

In 2015, Kiplinger's Personal Finance ranked Stony Brook 33rd best value among the country's public institutions for in-state students, and 26th for out-of-state students. In 2012, The Wall Street Journal ranked Stony Brook 8th among public universities sending students to elite graduate programs.

As of 2022, U.S. News & World Report gave the following rankings to graduate programs at Stony Brook: the School of Engineering is ranked 63rd, the School of Medicine is ranked 58th in Research and 112th-123rd in Primary Care nationally. Clinical Psychology ranked 3rd; Nuclear Physics (categorized as a Physics specialty) ranked 3rd; Geometry (categorized as a Mathematics specialty) ranked 9th; Topology (categorized as a Mathematics specialty) ranked 12th; Algebra/Number Theory (categorized as a Mathematics specialty) ranked 17th; Physics ranked 21st; Nursing-Midwifery ranked 27th; Physician Assistant program ranked 27th; Political Science ranked 28th; Mathematics ranked 30th; Psychology ranked 39th; Occupational Therapy ranked 42nd; Sociology ranked 45th; Computer Science ranked 46th; Earth Science ranked 47th; History ranked 48th; Economics ranked 53rd; Public Health ranked 55th; Physical Therapy ranked 57th; Chemistry ranked 58th; Health Care Management ranked 60th; English ranked 62nd; Social Work ranked 62nd; Biological Sciences ranked 74th; and Fine Arts ranked 152nd.

In 2017, the Shanghai Global Rankings of Academic Subjects ranked Stony Brook's Mathematics program 13th best worldwide.

College Factual's 2015 survey ranked Stony Brook University's Applied Mathematics program as 3rd best in the United States.

The Stony Brook College of Business earned AACSB International Accreditation in 2021.

In 2023, Stony Brook University Hospital (SBUH) was named in Becker's Hospital Review's list of "Great Hospitals in America".

The 2024 U.S. News & World Report gave the following rankings to undergraduate programs at Stony Brook: Computer Science ranked 56th; Nursing ranked 67th; Engineering ranked 67th; Economics ranked 88th; and Business ranked 135th.

In 2021, a team of students of the Journalism School won the Edward R. Murrow Awards for Excellence in Audio Feature Reporting.

=== Research ===
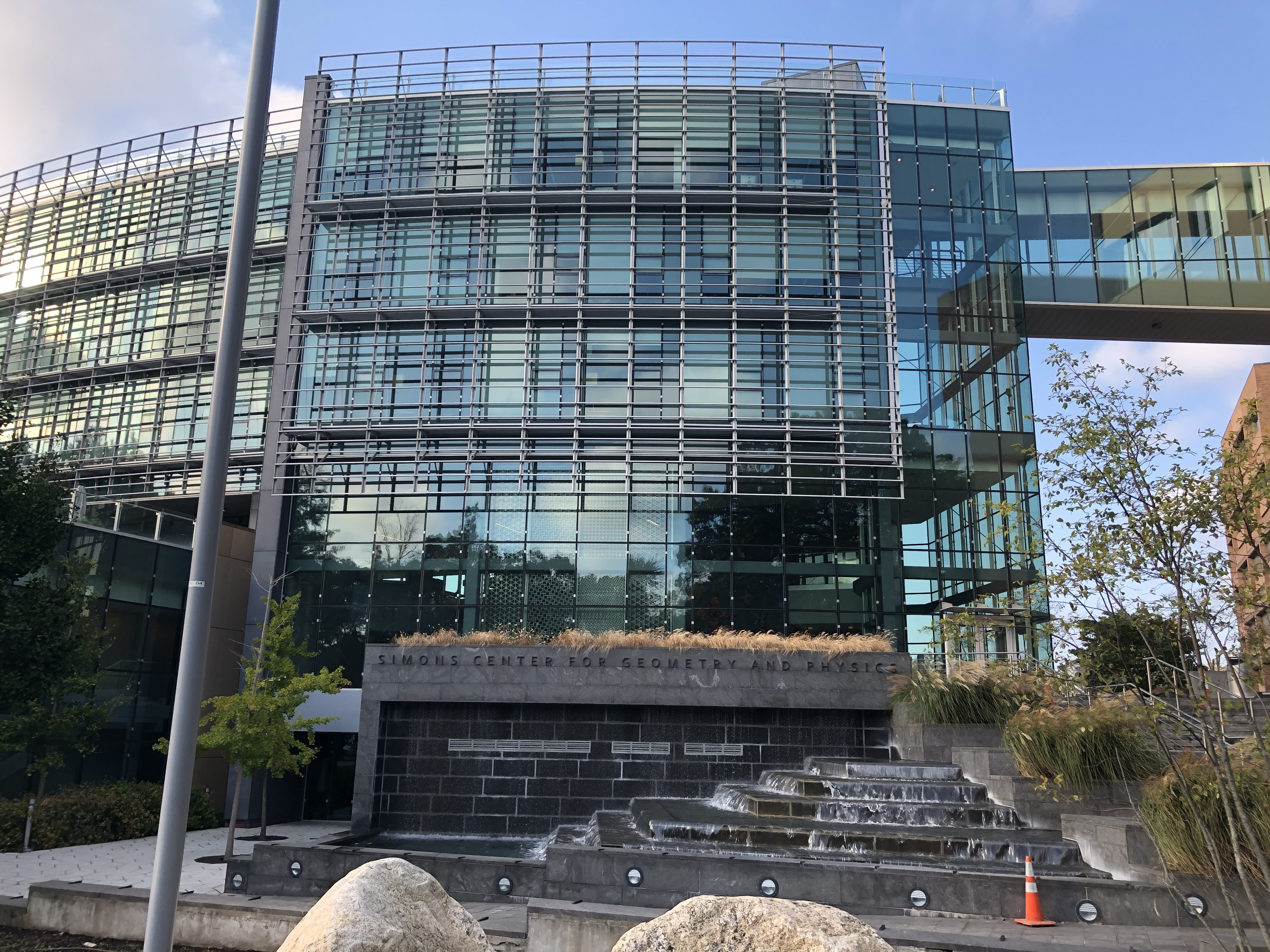
The Simons Center for Geometry and Physics was founded in 2007 by a gift from the Simons Foundation.

Stony Brook University is a public research institution, classified as "R1: Doctoral Universities – Very high research activity". It is one of 71 member universities of the Association of Universities (AAU) and one of 94 members of the Universities Research Association (URA), both representing the leading North American research universities.

The university co-manages Brookhaven National Laboratory, which is affiliated with the United States Department of Energy. In the Physical Sciences, Mathematics and Engineering area, some of the research centers of Stony Brook University are the Institute for Mathematical Sciences, the Institute for Advanced Computational Science, and the C. N. Yang Institute for Theoretical Physics among others. In the biomedical sciences, Stony Brook houses the Center for Biotechnology and the Institute of Chemical Biology and Drug Discovery, among many others. In March 2008, the university received $60 million endowment from James Simons to establish the Simons Center for Geometry and Physics. The Louis and Beatrice Laufer Center for Physical and Quantitative Biology was established by a generous gift in 2008 from Henry Laufer.

The School of Marine and Atmospheric Sciences (SoMAS) is the SUNY center for marine and atmospheric research, education, and public service. More than 300 graduate and undergraduate students from 16 different nations work and study at SoMAS. The School's students study coastal oceanographic processes and atmospheric sciences. The Marine Sciences Research Center, the original institute for marine studies, was incorporated into the new School of Marine and Atmospheric Sciences on June 15, 2007.

In July 2007, Stony Brook won a grant from the Department of Defense to devise ways to prevent terrorists from corrupting computers, and another from the Department of Homeland Security to design a system to detect radiation without triggering false alarms.

The New York Center for Computational Sciences (NYCCS), formed in 2007, is a joint venture of Stony Brook University and Brookhaven National Laboratory. Its centerpiece is an 18-rack Blue Gene /L and 2 rack Blue Gene/P massively parallel supercomputer based on the IBM system-on-chip technology, also known as New York Blue Gene supercomputer. In the June 2008 Top 500 supercomputer rankings New York Blue Gene/L was ranked 17th, and Blue Gene/P was ranked 75th. The total peak performance for both Blue Gene/L and Blue Gene/P is 103.22 teraflops (trillion floating-point calculations per second).

In 2016, Stony Brook University placed second at the Long Island regional round of the New York State Business Plan Competition. New York Institute of Technology placed first with four teams qualifying for the state competition's final round, while Stony Brook University had three teams qualifying for the state competition's final round.

==== Notable research and discoveries ====
There have been many notable research projects and important scientific discoveries at Stony Brook.

Years	Research/discovery
1969	Dated Moon rocks and estimated the age of the Moon
	Created a new ultrasound method that speeds the healing of bone fractures
	Discovered the link between emphysema and smoking
	Developed the drug that is recommended for all cardiac angioplasties (abciximab)
1974	Created the first MRI image of a living organism
	Discovered the golden bamboo lemur
	Identified and cataloged 328 distant galaxies
	Using a single electron, created the smallest electric switch in the world
1975	Yang and Simons set off the gauge-theory revolution in differential topology
1976	Formulation of supergravity
1982	Invented virtual colonoscopy
1998	FDA approved abciximab and Periostat (doxycycline)
1998	Discovered important fossil linking birds to dinosaurs
2002	Synthesized the first virus, in vitro, polio
2007	Demonstrated that Homo erectus may not have evolved from Homo habilis
2008	Remains of Beelzebufo, or devil frog, largest frog to ever exist, discovered in Madagascar

== Student life ==
Stony Brook has a wide variety of student-run organizations on campus, which include sororities and fraternities, and a count of almost 300 recognized student clubs and organizations. The Undergraduate Student Government at Stony Brook University is trusted with the responsibility of budgeting the undergraduate student activity fee which funds most student run organizations on campus. The Graduate Student Organization is responsible for budgeting the graduate student activity fee, and supplies a variety of funding opportunities, programming, student services, and funding for departmental and student organizations.

The oldest campus newspaper is The Statesman, which was founded in 1957 when the university was in Oyster Bay. Other publications include the Stony Brook Press, Stony Brook Independent, Blackworld, and the Asian American E-Zine. Stony Brook also has a campus-wide public radio station, WUSB, which serves most of Long Island and dedicates programming to Stony Brook athletics and other events on campus.

Stony Brook once had a reputation as a commuter school, though in 2024, more than half of its undergraduates live on campus, as do a quarter of its graduate students. Around 83% of freshmen students are on-campus residents. Other schools have since adopted similar practices to increase residential numbers.

=== Student body ===
Undergraduate demographics as of fall 2023
Race and ethnicity	Total
Asian	36%
White	27%
Hispanic	15%
International student	8%
Black	6%
Unknown	5%
Two or more races	3%
Economic diversity
Low-income (Note: The percentage of students who received an income-based federal Pell grant intended for low-income students.)	38%
Affluent (Note: The percentage of students who are a part of the American middle class at the bare minimum.)	62%

In fall 2021, the university had an enrollment of 26,782 students: 18,010 undergraduate students and 8,772 graduate students.

Of all students, 23,072 (86 percent) are U.S. citizens or permanent residents representing all states of the United States and 3,536 (13 percent) are international students representing over a hundred countries around the world.

21,103 students hail from New York state, accounting for 79 percent of the student body. 12,061 students (45 percent) of the student body reside in Nassau or Suffolk County on Long Island, while 6,766 students (25 percent) reside in New York City.

2,276 students (8.5 percent) reside north of New York City, with Westchester County, Rockland County and Orange County as the three most common. 7.3 percent of students live out of state, most represented by New Jersey, California and Connecticut.

Half of Stony Brook's international students hail from China. An additional 18% come from India and 10% from South Korea. In 2021, there were more Asian American undergraduate students than White American students attending Stony Brook for the first time in the university's history.

=== Events and traditions ===
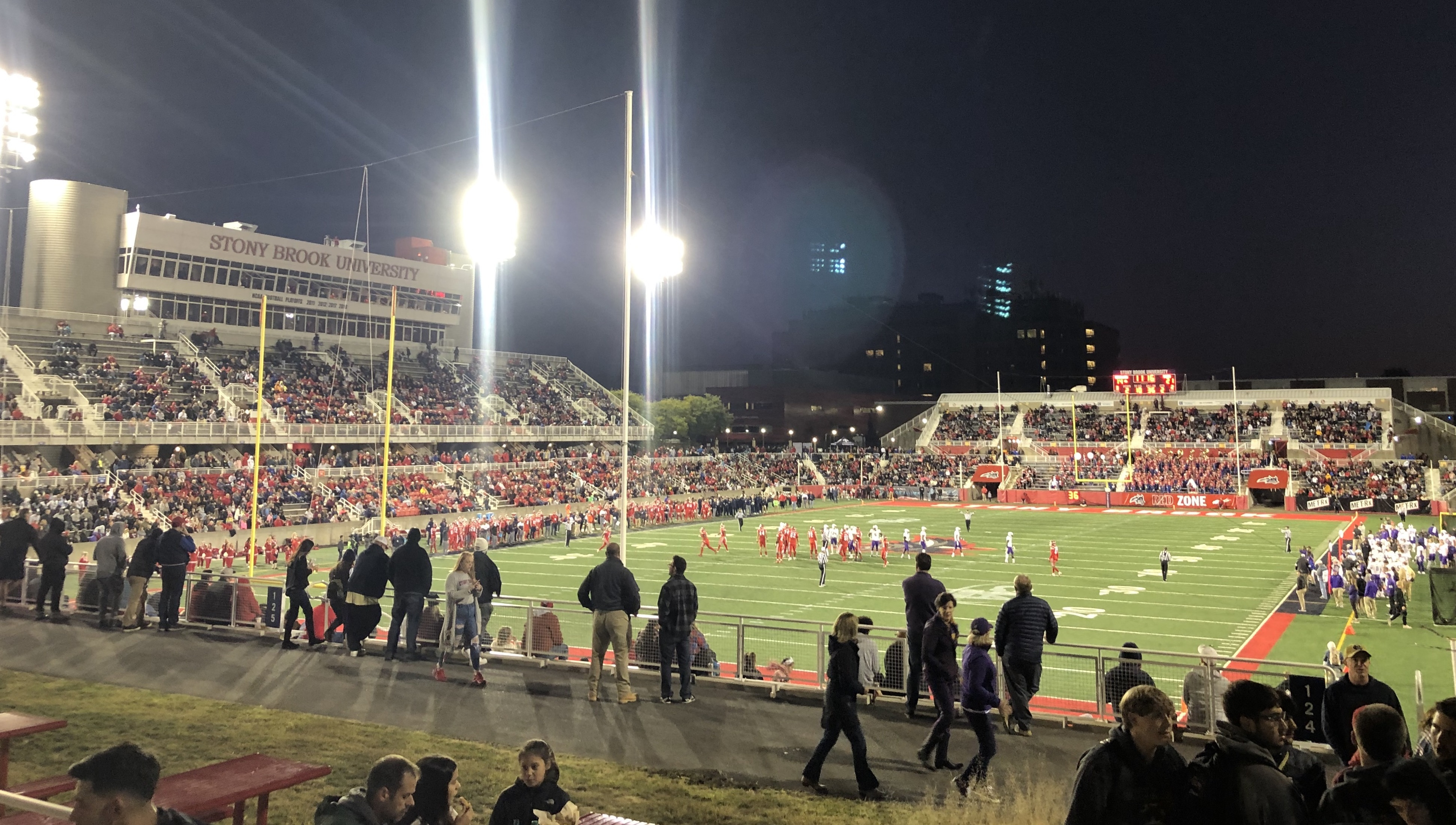
Homecoming at Kenneth P. LaValle Stadium in 2019

Incoming freshmen are welcomed to the university in August with First Night Out, a night of events taking place on the Friday in which they move in. Organized by Student Engagement and Activities, the night consists of a "Party on the Plaza" as well as various assorted activities. Wolfieland, an annual carnival, began in 2016 and takes place during September. Stony Brook University's annual Homecoming celebration, known as Wolfstock, takes place in October and features numerous activities throughout the week, including Homecoming Hoopla & Carnival on Wednesday and the Seawolves Showcase talent show on Friday. Wolfstock culminates in Stony Brook's annual Homecoming football game on Saturday, which traditionally draws record-breaking crowds upwards of 12,000 people. The homecoming court is presented during halftime, dating back to 1984. Beginning in 2018, Stony Brook shifted to the gender-neutral title of 'royal' in lieu of 'king' and 'queen'.

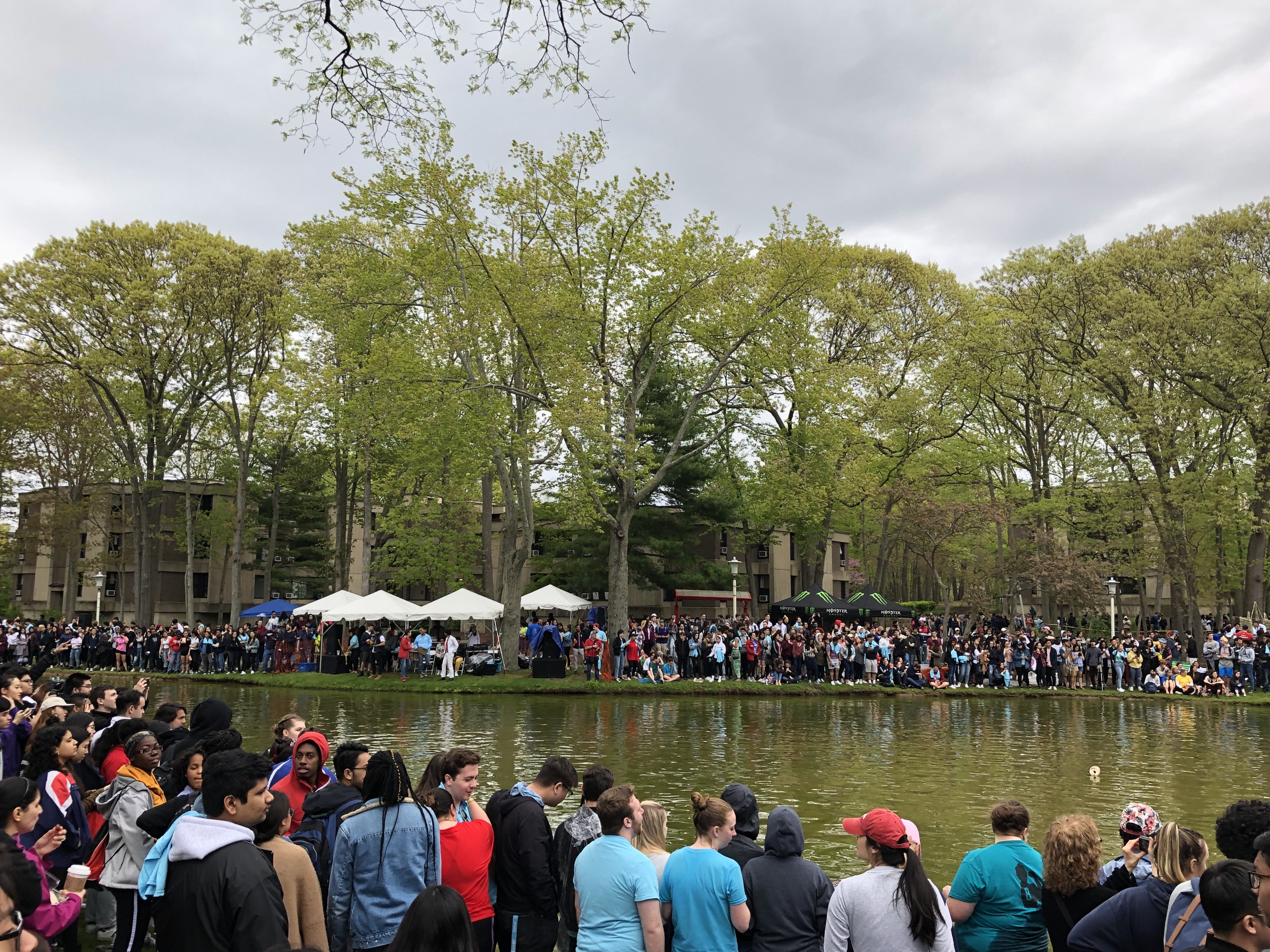
The 2019 Roth Pond Regatta

Academic activity pauses weekly on Wednesdays from 1:00 to 2:30 p.m. in a period known as Campus Life Time, which was established in February 1991. During Campus Life Time, no classes are scheduled and events take place at the Academic Mall, allowing students to take a break from their studies and come together for social activity.

First-year students are assigned a book written by a notable figure, who speaks to the entire freshman class on Commons Day in the fall semester. Commons Day speakers have included Supreme Court associate justice Sonia Sotomayor, author Janet Mock, designer Joshua Davis and journalist Charles M. Blow.

The Festival of Lights started in 2000 as an annual Stony Brook tradition that celebrates the numerous cultures and faiths which celebrate during the holiday season. The festival is preceded by Light the Brook, a tree lighting ceremony at the Academic Mall. Midnight Breakfast takes place during the first Monday of Finals Week in both semesters, as the dining halls stay open late to serve breakfast foods to students.

To celebrate Earth Day, Stony Brook holds a week-long Earthstock celebration in the week culminating in the Earthstock Festival. Numerous environment-themed events take place throughout the week, with the most known tradition being the Rubber Duck Race held at "The Brook" adjacent to the Administration building.

Starting in 1993, Strawberry Fest is held on the first Wednesday of May, where students and faculty gather at the Academic Mall to eat an array of strawberry-themed foods with live music and student performances. In 1998, Stony Brook began to hold Diversity Day during the same day as Strawberry Fest, planned and organized by the Office of Multicultural Affairs to highlight the diverse cultures which make up the university.

The yearly Roth Pond Regatta, held since 1989, attracts dozens of competitors and thousands of attendees, including students, faculty, staff, and alumni. The competition involves groups making boats out of cardboard and tape, with the challenge to get across the Roth Pond first without sinking.

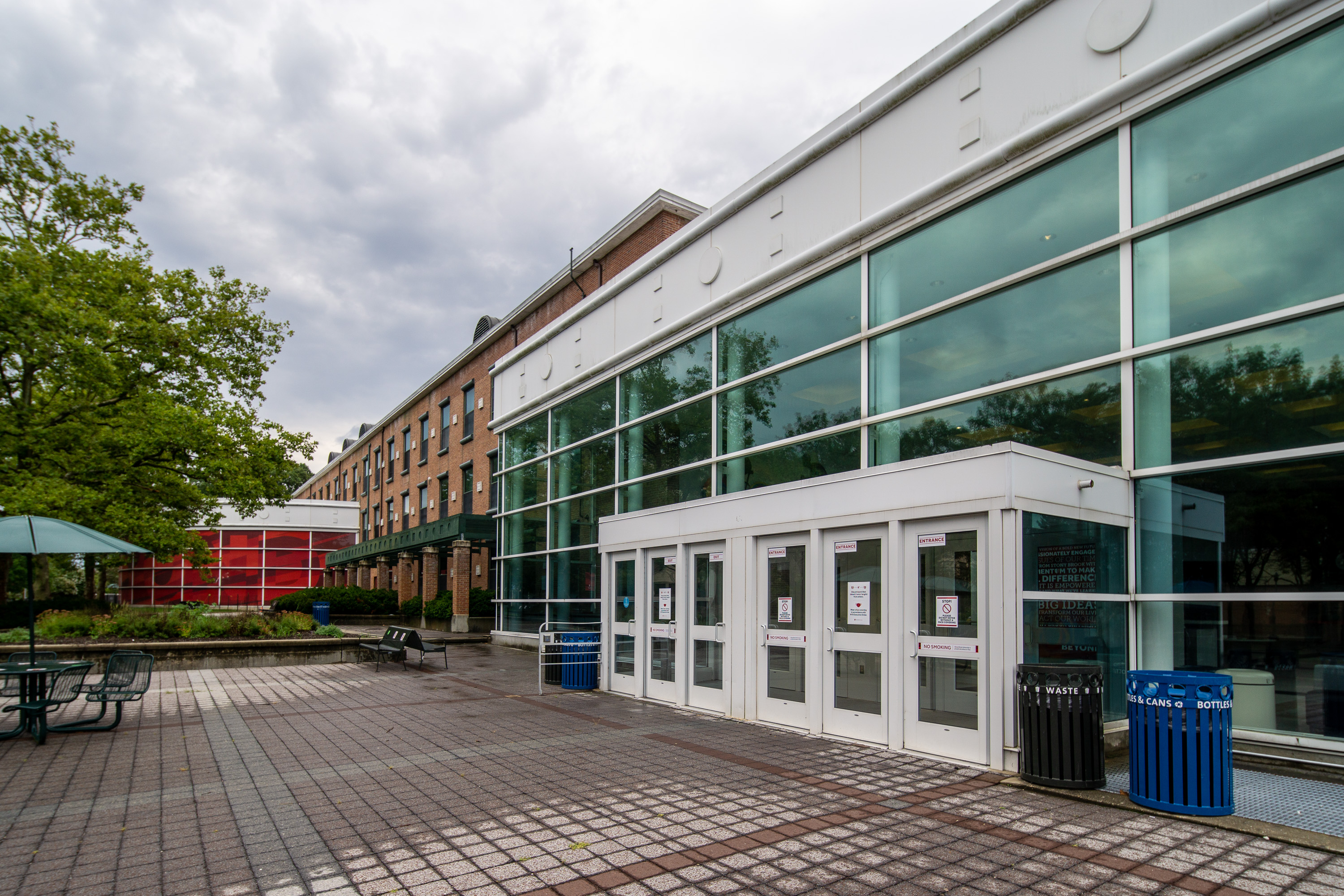
The Student Activity Center (SAC), an event space and cafeteria

Stony Brook holds two annual concerts – Back to the Brook during the fall semester and Brookfest during the spring semester. The inaugural Back to the Brook took place in 2012 and featured Reel Big Fish at the Staller Steps. Since then, Mac Miller, Lupe Fiasco, Walk the Moon, Fetty Wap and Post Malone have headlined Back to the Brook. 2018's Back to the Brook was cancelled after only 24 tickets were sold for headliner Ashanti a week before the concert. 2019's Back to the Brook was controversially cancelled again. The historic Stony Brook concert series was revived in 2011 with Brookfest hosting headliners Bruno Mars and Janelle Monáe. Brookfest has since been headlined by Wiz Khalifa and Miguel, Ludacris and Grouplove, Childish Gambino and Diplo, Panic! at the Disco and Twenty One Pilots, Future and Cash Cash, DNCE and Joey Badass, 21 Savage and A Boogie wit da Hoodie, and ASAP Ferg and Aminé.

In the early 2010s, Stony Brook's Graduate Student Organization sponsored a concert series on the first Thursday of every month titled Stony Brooklyn, focused on exposing the student body to up-and-coming indie rock musicians from the New York area. This concert series included acts like The Antlers, Parquet Courts, Beach Fossils, The Drums, Ra Ra Riot, Das Racist and The Front Bottoms playing concerts on the Stony Brook campus. As interest in this scene declined, the series was shut down by 2017.

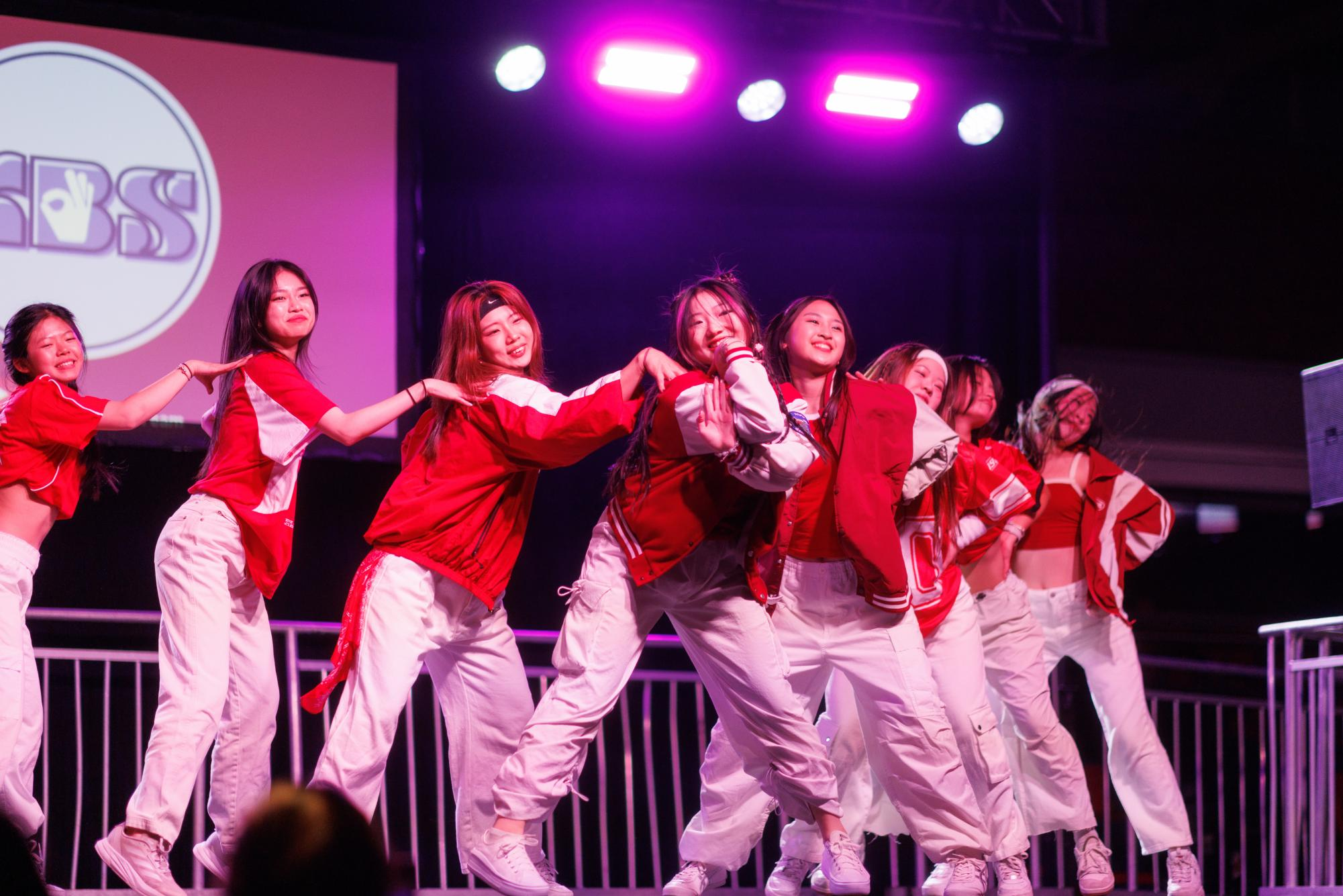
KBS Dance Team at the 2024 Seawolves Showcase

Stony Brook University has a lively performing arts community; at least 38 performance-based clubs had been registered as of August 2025. Performance groups on campus range from theatre troupes, music groups, and dance teams, many of which are associated with a cultural organization. Performance teams at Stony Brook include PUSO Modern (Philippine United Student Organization), CASB Dance Team (Chinese Association at Stony Brook), KBS Dance Team (no affiliated organization), and more. Stony Brook's Department of Student Engagement and Activities hosts Seawolves Showcase, an event dedicated to showcasing organizations on campus dedicated to the performing arts. The first Seawolves Showcase was held in 2010 and continues to be held every year during homecoming weekend. 2025 marks the fifteenth annual Seawolves Showcase, which was held on October 24.

=== Spirit of Stony Brook marching band ===
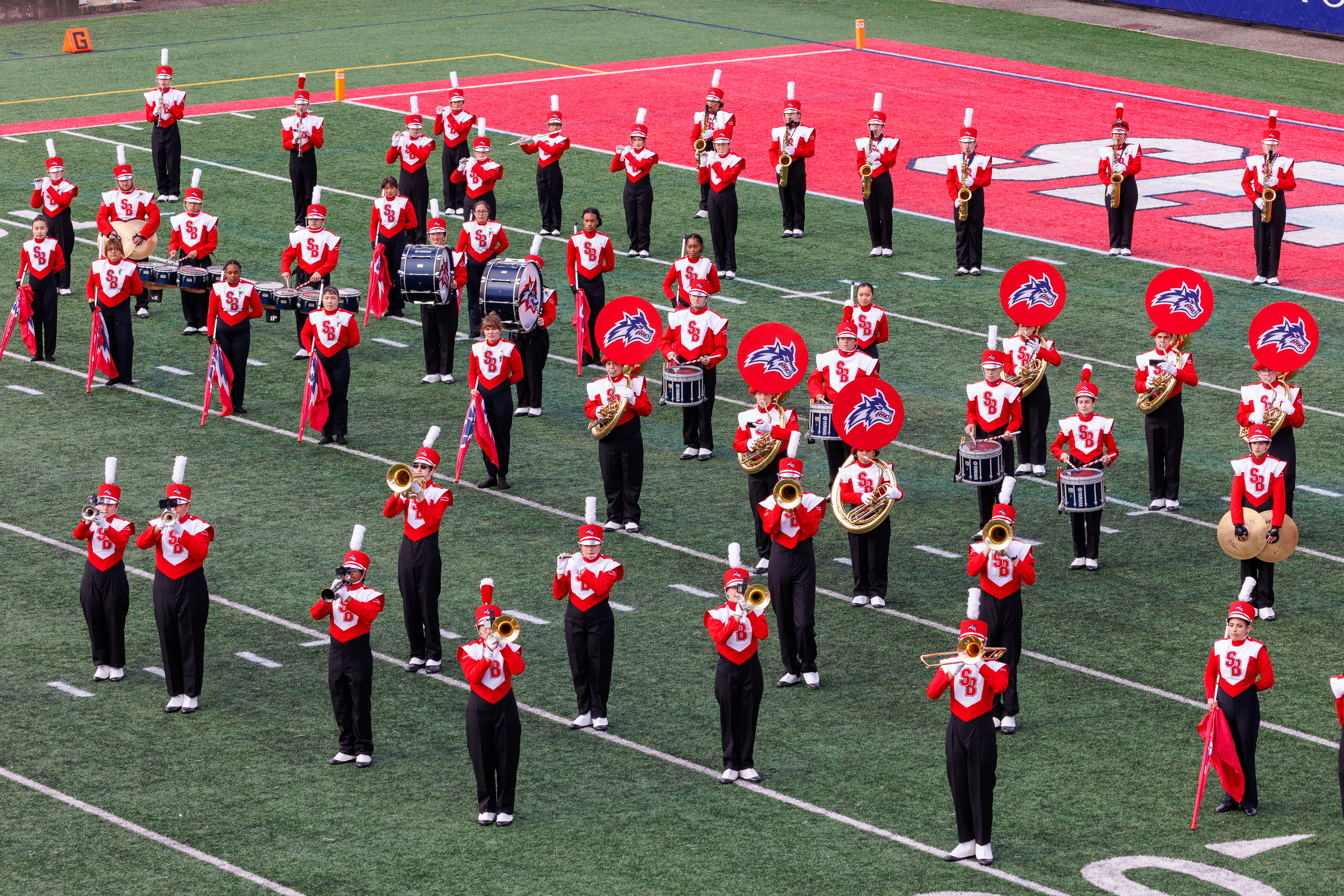
The Spirit of Stony Brook marching band

The Spirit of Stony Brook marching band was created in 2006 by Jerrold Stein, the dean of students at the time, and plays at athletic games and other events. The first public performance was at the September 2006 convocation. The band grew to 70 members in the second year and added additional staff. The band first traveled to the America East men's basketball tournament in March 2007 and has done so regularly ever since. By July 2008, the band had reached 100 members, and by the mid-2010s had attracted over 200 members. John Leddy was the first director of the marching band, from 2006 to 2013. Leddy was followed by Shayna Stahl (2013–2016) and Christopher Parks (2016–2018). Justin Stolarik has been the band director since 2018.

== Athletics ==
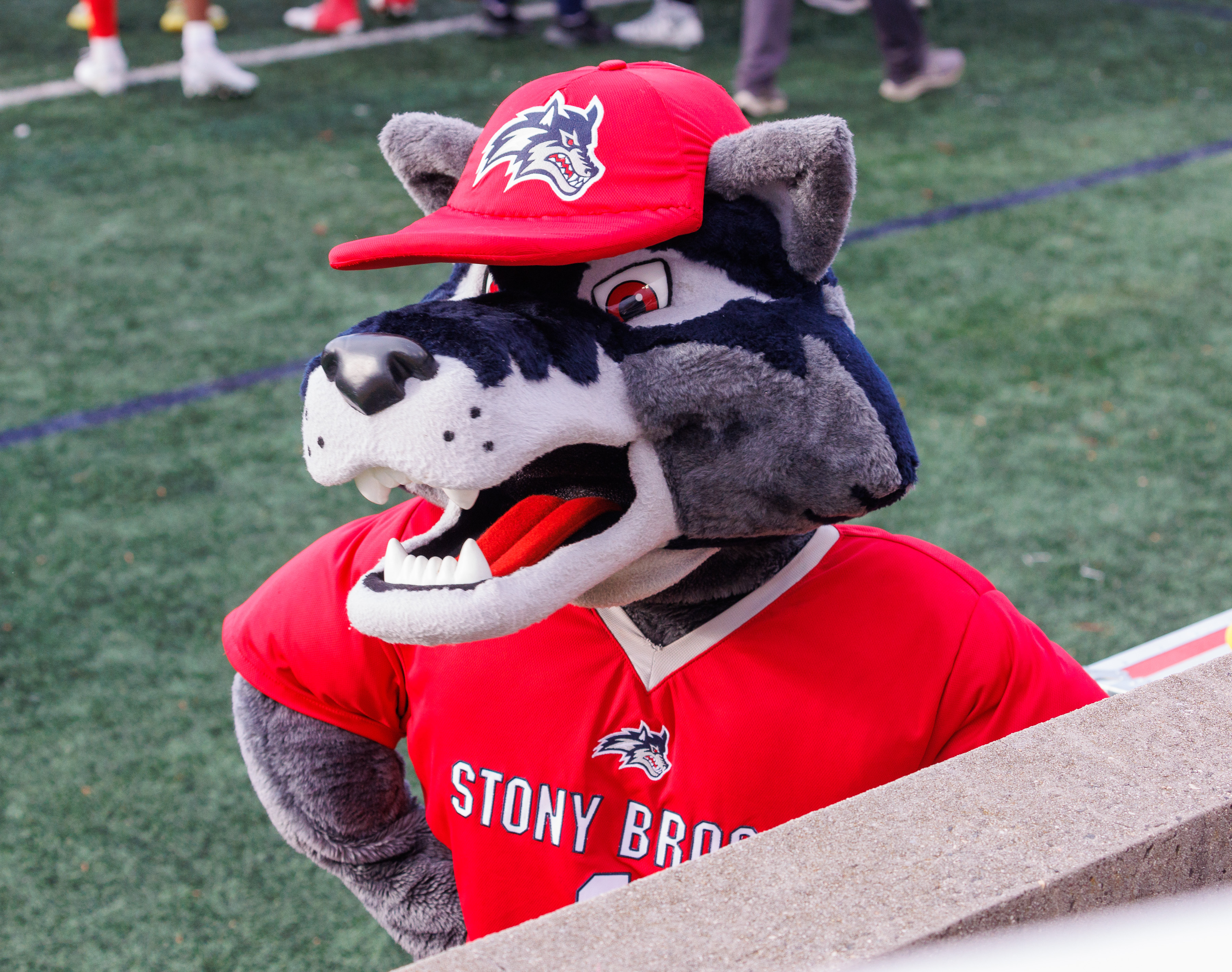
Wolfie the Seawolf is the mascot of the Stony Brook Seawolves.

Stony Brook University's intercollegiate athletics teams, known as the Stony Brook Seawolves, compete in the National Collegiate Athletic Association (NCAA) at the Division I level and are members of the Colonial Athletic Association, beginning on July 1, 2022. The school's current director of athletics is Shawn Heilbron, who was hired in May 2014 after serving as Senior Associate Athletic Director for Development at Oregon State University.

The university's athletics teams were originally known as the Soundmen or the Baymen in the early 1950s when the campus was located in Oyster Bay. Their name was changed to the Warriors in 1960, and again to the Patriots and Lady Patriots in 1966. In 1994, as Stony Brook prepared to become a Division I program, the team nickname was changed again, this time to its current day incarnation, the Seawolves. The team's mascot is named Wolfie.

Beginning in 2019, Stony Brook announced a partnership with SNY to broadcast football, basketball and lacrosse games on the channel. Stony Brook games on WUSB were announced by Josh Caray, grandson of famed broadcaster Harry Caray and son of Skip Caray until his departure in 2019.

The Stony Brook Patriots participated at the Division III level until 1995, when they moved up to Division II with the ultimate goal of soon reaching Division I. On June 3, 1997, president Shirley Kenny announced that the Seawolves' entire athletics program would play at the Division I level beginning during the 1999–00 season. Stony Brook joined the America East Conference in 2001 until leaving in 2022 and also played women's tennis in the Missouri Valley Conference.

Stony Brook garnered national attention during their 2012 College World Series run. The Seawolves upset the LSU Tigers in a three-game series to win the Baton Rouge Super Regional and reach the College World Series in Omaha, the first America East team to do so. Coach Matt Senk was awarded the National College Baseball Writers Association's Coach of the Year award. Outfielder Travis Jankowski was drafted by the San Diego Padres in the first round of the 2012 MLB draft.

After going winless in four consecutive America East Finals in men's basketball, the Seawolves earned their first bid to the NCAA tournament in 2016 by defeating the Vermont Catamounts 80–74. They lost to Kentucky in the first round of the NCAA Tournament by a score of 85–57.

Stony Brook has established itself as a dominant force in women's lacrosse. Since 2013, the Seawolves have finished in first place in the America East for eight straight seasons, making eight consecutive NCAA Division I Women's Lacrosse Championship tournaments. During the 2018 season, the Seawolves were ranked No. 1 nationally in all three major polls (IWLCA Coaches' Poll, Cascade/Inside Lacrosse, Nike/US Lacrosse) for at least ten weeks.

In recent years, Stony Brook's athletic facilities have undergone several additions and renovations. The Goldstein Family Student-Athlete Development Center opened in 2006 after a million-dollar donation by alumnus Stuart Goldstein. In 2011, Joe Nathan Field, dedicated to six-time MLB All-Star relief pitcher and Stony Brook alumnus Joe Nathan, opened after renovations to the former University Field were made possible by Nathan's $500,000 donation. Island Federal Arena, formerly known as the Stony Brook University Arena, opened in 2014 after a two-year, $21.1 million renovation. The Pritchard Gymnasium, current home of the volleyball team and former home of the men's and women's basketball teams, underwent a $1.5 million renovation in 2008. Alumnus Glenn Dubin donated $4.3 million to a strength and conditioning facility named the Dubin Family Athletic Performance Center, which opened in 2012. The Dubin family also pledged $5 million for a $10 million for the Dubin Family Indoor Training Center, which opened in 2020.

== Notable people ==
=== Notable alumni ===
- Chris Algieri, 2007, professional boxer
- Michael R. Anastasio, Ph.D., 1980, physicist
- Thomas Balcerski, 2008, author, historian
- Kim Barnes Arico, athletic coach
- Bruce Bawer, Ph.D., 1983, writer and activist
- Joy Behar, 1966, television host
- Pat Benatar, musician (dropped out)
- Yasemin Besen-Cassino, Ph.D., 2005, sociologist
- Spencer Black, educator and politician
- Mark Bridges, 1983, costume designer
- Adrien Brody, actor
- Dan Clawson, Ph.D., 1978, sociologist and activist
- Harris Cooper, psychologist
- Patricia S. Cowings, 1970, aerospace psychophysiologist
- Steve Cuozzo, 1971, journalist'
- Dabuz, 2017, professional video game player
- Buck Dharma, musician
- Glenn Dubin, 1978, investor
- Patricia Eddington, politician
- Carolyn Ellis, Ph.D., 1981, sociologist
- Ayşe Erzan, Ph.D., 1976, theoretical physicist
- Diane Farr, 1995, actress on
- Hume Feldman, Ph.D., 1993, physicist;
- Jonine Figueroa, Ph.D., 2004, epidemiologist;
- Lee A. Fleisher, M.D., chief medical officer and director of the Centers for Medicare & Medicaid Services Center for Clinical Standards and Quality
- Marie-Josée Fortin, Ph.D., 1992, ecologist
- Keiko Fujimori, Peruvian politician
- Robert L. Gallucci, 1968, diplomat, author, academic
- Steven K. Galson, 1978, former acting surgeon general of the United States
- David Gelernter, 1982, computer science, Unabomber victim
- Richard Gelfond, 1976, CEO of IMAX Corporation
- Rohini Godbole, Ph.D., 1979, physicist
- Christine Goerke, 1994, dramatic soprano
- Carol K. Hall, Ph.D., 1972, chemical engineer;
- Victoria Hart, 2010, YouTube personality, educator, inventor
- Brosl Hasslacher, Ph.D., 1971, theoretical physicist
- Daria Hazuda, 1989, biochemist
- Carl Heastie, 1990, politician
- Julia Heiman, Ph.D., 1975, sexologist and psychologist
- John L. Hennessy, 1975, computer science
- Scott Higham, 1982, journalist
- Mitch Horowitz, 1988, historian and publisher
- Leslie Irvine, Ph.D., 1997, sociologist
- Travis Jankowski, 2012, baseball player
- Peter R. Jennings, Canadian physicist and entrepreneur;
- Suzanne Bennett Johnson, Ph.D., 1974, psychologist
- Latoya Joyner, 2008, politician
- Rinat Kedem, Ph.D., 1993, mathematician and physicist
- Mark Kishlansky, 1970, historian
- Tom Koehler, 2008, former baseball pitcher
- Melanie Kreis, 1994, German businesswoman
- Risa Lavizzo-Mourey, philanthropist
- Marshall Leonard, M.D., 2016, professional soccer
- Steve Levy, 1981, politician
- Kevin Kwan Loucks, 2013, musician
- Gilda Lyons, Ph.D., 2005, composer, vocalist, and visual artist
- Steven Mackey, 1980, composer, electric guitarist,
- James L. Manley, Ph.D., 1976, biologist
- Kevin M. McCoy, 1978, U.S. vice admiral; 42nd commander of Naval Sea Systems Command
- Jeffrey Meldrum, Ph.D., 1989, anatomist, cryptozoologist,
- Mark Mizruchi, Ph.D., 1980, sociologist
- Leah Modigliani, Ph.D., 2010, artist and historian
- Dianne Morales (born 1967), non-profit executive and political candidate
- Momina Mustehsan, Pakistani singer, musician, and social activist
- Richie Narvaez, 1986, 1988, novelist
- Joe Nathan, 1997, baseball player
- Callistus Ndlovu, Zimbabwean politician
- Jon Oringer, 1997, businessman
- Vinay Pathak, Indian actor
- Sandy Pearlman, 1966, music producer and rock band manager
- Andrew S. Penson, billionaire real estate developer
- Nan Phinney, 1972, accelerator physicist
- Carolyn Porco, 1974, planetary scientist
- Colin Quinn, comedian, director, writer, actor
- Gwendalyn J. Randolph, Ph.D., 1995, immunologist
- Sumathi Rao, Ph.D., 1983, physicist
- Jef Raskin, 1964, computer science
- Dominick Reyes, 2013, mixed martial artist
- Burton Rocks, 1994, sports attorney and agent
- G. Samantha Rosenthal, 2015, historian, writer, and professor
- Ranjan Roy, Ph.D., 1974, mathematics professor
- Abhik Roychoudhury, Ph.D., 2000, computer science
- Deane Rykerson, 1972, architect and politician
- Peter Sarnow, Ph.D., 1982, German virologist;
- Laura Schlessinger, 1968, talk radio host
- Andrew Sega, 1997, video game music composer
- Lasana M. Sekou, B.A., 1982, poet, author, publisher
- Ashoke Sen, Ph.D., 1982, Indian theoretical physicist
- Charles N. Serhan, 1978, experimental pathologist
- Chia Shen, 1983, computer scientist,
- Drew Shindell, Ph.D., 1995, physicist and climate specialist
- Duane Silverstein, 1974, conservationist
- Tanya M. Smith, Ph.D., 2004, human evolutionary biologist;
- Eric Stach, M.B.A., 2018, materials scientist
- Bettie M. Steinberg, 1976, chief scientific officer of the Feinstein Institute for Medical Research
- T. Bill Sutherland, Ph.D., 1968, theoretical physicist
- Henry Swieca, B.A., 1979, investor
- Kara Thomas, 2013, author of young adult fiction
- Jaw-Shen Tsai, Ph.D., 1983, physicist
- Michael Tuts, Ph.D., 1979, particle physicist;
- Peter Ungar, Ph.D., 1992, evolutionary biologist and paleoanthropologist
- Gabriel Vicéns, composer, guitarist, and visual artist
- Jameel Warney, 2016, former NBA player
- Kent Washington, 1978, basketball player
- Bernd Würsig, Ph.D., 1978, marine mammal behavioral ecologist;
- Stephen Shing-Toung Yau, PhD, 1976, mathematician
- Daniel Zamora, 2015, baseball pitcher

=== Notable faculty ===
- Anissa Abi-Dargham, psychiatrist
- Qanta Ahmed, physician
- Alan Alda, actor
- Luis Alvarez-Gaume, theoretical physicist
- Katherine Aubrecht, chemist
- Barry Barish, experimental physicist
- Elizabeth M. Boon, biochemist
- Ken A. Dill, biophysicist and chemist
- Simon Donaldson, mathematician
- Richard Dyer-Bennet, singer of folk music
- James Glimm, mathematician,
- Bernard Greenhouse, cellist
- Yusuf Hannun, molecular biologist, biochemist
- Alfred Kazin, writer and literary critic
- Richard Leakey, paleoanthropologist
- Laszlo Milhaly, physicist
- John Milnor, mathematician,
- Mary C. Rawlinson, philosophy professor
- Wolf Schäfer, historian
- Stanley Siegel, psychotherapy
- Dennis Sullivan, mathematician
- Esther Takeuchi, chemical engineer
- Jacobus Verbaarschot, physicist,
- Patricia Wright, primatologist
- Alexander Zamolodchikov, physicist
- Yanhong Annie Liu, computer scientist
