= Jonine Figueroa =

U.S. epidemiologist

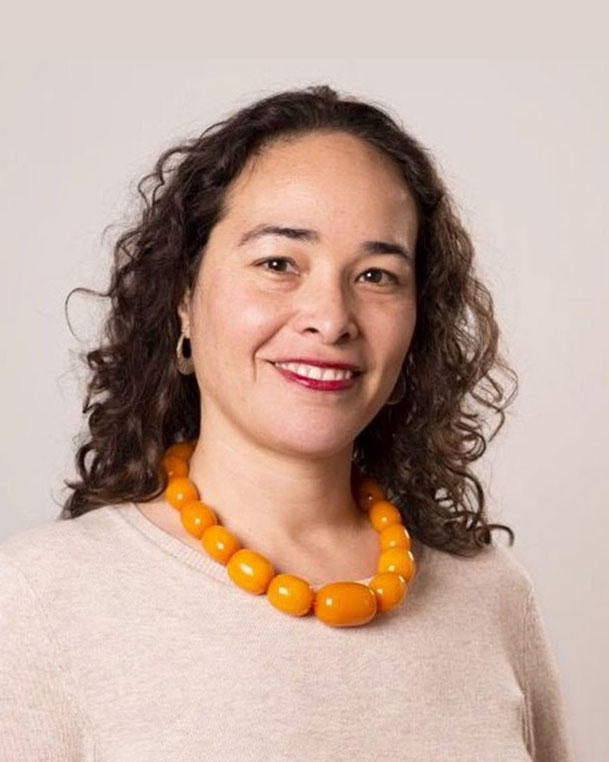
- Education: Pennsylvania State University; Stony Brook University; Columbia University
- Scientific career
- Fields: Breast cancer epidemiology
- Workplaces: National Cancer Institute; University of Edinburgh
- Doctoral advisor: Michael J. Hayman

Jonine Figueroa is an American epidemiologist specializing in breast cancer epidemiology. She is a senior investigator and distinguished scholar in the integrative tumor epidemiology branch at the National Cancer Institute. She was previously a tenured professor and chair of molecular epidemiology and global cancer prevention at the University of Edinburgh.

== Life ==
Dr. Figueroa received a B.S. in genetics and developmental biology from the Pennsylvania State University, a Ph.D. (2004) in molecular genetics and microbiology from Stony Brook University, and an M.P.H. from Columbia University Mailman School of Public Health. Michael J. Hayman was her doctoral advisor. From 2005 to 2008, she completed postdoctoral training in the laboratory of Montserrat García-Closas in the Division of Cancer Epidemiology and Genetics (DCEG) at the National Cancer Institute (NCI) as a cancer prevention fellow.

From 2008 to 2015, Dr. Figueroa was an investigator in the DCEG. She was a tenured professor and chair of molecular epidemiology and global cancer prevention at the University of Edinburgh, where she is an honorary fellow. Her research at the University of Edinburgh focused in understanding the interactions between genetic and environmental factors in both breast and bladder cancer development by utilizing case-control, cohort, and large consortium epidemiology studies globally. In 2023, as the DCEG Multi-Principal Investigator Search (MPIS) pilot program's first researcher, Dr. Figueroa returned to the NCI as a senior investigator and NIH distinguished scholar in the integrative tumor epidemiology branch. She researches the interplay of biological, environmental, and socioeconomic determinants in cancer epidemiology studies by utilizing supplemental data records derived from the Surveillance, Epidemiology and End Results (SEER). Her specialties are focused on prevention and detection of breast cancer epidemiology and to analyze the links of socioeconomic factors associated with chronic disease. These integrative research efforts aim to improve outcomes in the public health sector via statistical applications and use of molecular lab technologies.
