= Kara Thomas =

American novelist

- Born: Kara Mustafa (Now known as Kara Thomas); March 21, 1990
- Education: Stony Brook University
- Occupations: Novelist, Television writer, Television producer
- Writing career
- Genre: Young adult fiction
- Website: www.kara-thomas.com

Kara Thomas (born Kara Mustafa, March 21, 1990), is an American author of novels for young adults and television writer best known for her 2018 novel The Cheerleaders.

== Biography ==
Kara Thomas is an American author of young adult fiction. Raised on Long Island, New York, Kara attended Stony Brook University and graduated with a degree in English. She wrote Prep School Confidential during her final year at Stony Brook. In July 2013, she signed a blind-script deal for a television pilot with Warner Bros. TV (Untitled Kara Taylor Project). In August 2013 it was announced that Rashida Jones and Will McCormack are developing Taylor's dramedy The Revengers for the CW, for which Taylor will serve as writer and co-executive producer.

Thomas currently lives on Long Island with her husband and son.

== Works ==
=== As Kara Taylor ===
- Prep School Confidential (St. Martin's Press/Thomas Dunne Books, July 30, 2013)
- Wicked Little Secrets (St. Martin's Press/Thomas Dunne Books, March 4, 2014)
- Deadly Little Sins (St. Martin's Press/Thomas Dunne Books, August 5, 2014)

=== As Kara Thomas ===
- The Darkest Corners, Delacorte Press, April 19 2016, ISBN 978-0553521467
- Little Monsters, Delacorte Press, July 25 2017, ISBN 978-0553521498
- The Cheerleaders, Delacorte Press, July 31 2018, ISBN 978-1524718329
- That Weekend, Delacorte Press, June 29 2021, ISBN 978-1524718367
- Out Of The Ashes, Thomas & Mercer, May 1 2023, ISBN 978-1662509537
- Lost to Dune Road, Thomas & Mercer, April 16 2024, ISBN 978-1662509551
- The Champions, Delacorte Press, August 27 2024, ISBN 978-0593379974
