= Stony Brook Manhattan =

Coordinates: 40°44′33.85″N 73°59′2.52″W

- Type: Public
- Active: 2002–2017
- President: N/A
- Undergraduates: N/A
- Location: (United States) New York City, New York, USA
- Website: stonybrook.edu/nyc/

Stony Brook Manhattan was established in 2002 as a branch facility of Stony Brook University. It consolidated operations in 2011 to the 3rd floor of 387 Park Avenue South, with a classroom entrance around the corner at 101 East 27th Street. The 18,000-square-foot (1,700 m^{2}) site allowed Stony Brook to offer professional and graduate courses targeted towards students in the city; undergraduate courses were held primarily during the summer and winter sessions. Conferences and special events took place throughout the year. As of February 2017, the lease for the facility was terminated and classes are no longer offered.
