= Elizabeth M. Boon =

American academic and biochemist

Elizabeth M. Boon is an American biochemist who is a professor and associate dean of the graduate school at Stony Brook University. She is known for her research on the biochemical mechanisms used by bacteria to regulate biofilm formation.

== Education and career ==
Boon was an undergraduate at Kenyon College where she majored in chemistry. She moved to the California Institute of Technology for her graduate studies, working with Jacqueline Barton on DNA-mediated electrochemical reactions. Following her Ph.D., Boon was a National Institutes of Health Ruth L. Kirschstein National Research Service Award postdoctoral fellow at the University of California, Berkeley working with Michael Marletta. At Stony Brook University she serves as a professor of chemistry. In 2018 she was made co-director of the Chemical Biology Training Program, an NIH-funded T32 program. In 2023 she was named associate dean of the graduate school.

== Awards and honors ==
- 2011, Elected a Kavli Fellow by the National Academy of Sciences and the Kavli Foundation
- 2008, Presidential Early Career Award for Scientists and Engineers
- 2008, Office of Naval Research Young Investigator Award

== Selected publications ==
- Boon, Elizabeth M.; Ceres, Donato M.; Drummond, Thomas G.; Hill, Michael G.; Barton, Jacqueline K. (2000). "Mutation detection by electrocatalysis at DNA-modified electrodes". Nature Biotechnology. 18 (10): 1096–1100. doi:10.1038/80301. ISSN 1546-1696. PMID 11017050.
- Boon, Elizabeth M.; Huang, Shirley H.; Marletta, Michael A. (2005). "A molecular basis for NO selectivity in soluble guanylate cyclase". Nature Chemical Biology. 1 (1): 53–59. doi:10.1038/nchembio704. ISSN 1552-4469. PMID 16407994.
- Arora, Dhruv P.; Hossain, Sajjad; Xu, Yueming; Boon, Elizabeth M. (2015-06-23). "Nitric Oxide Regulation of Bacterial Biofilms". Biochemistry. 54 (24): 3717–3728. doi:10.1021/bi501476n. ISSN 0006-2960. PMID 25996573.
- Henares, Bernadette M.; Higgins, Kate E.; Boon, Elizabeth M. (2012-08-17). "Discovery of a Nitric Oxide Responsive Quorum Sensing Circuit in Vibrio harveyi". ACS Chemical Biology. 7 (8): 1331–1336. doi:10.1021/cb300215t. ISSN 1554-8929. PMID 22606970.
- Hossain, Sajjad; Boon, Elizabeth M. (2017-06-09). "Discovery of a Novel Nitric Oxide Binding Protein and Nitric-Oxide-Responsive Signaling Pathway in Pseudomonas aeruginosa". ACS Infectious Diseases. 3 (6): 454–461. doi:10.1021/acsinfecdis.7b00027. ISSN 2373-8227. PMC 5468770. PMID 28238256.
