= Stanley Siegel =

American psychotherapist

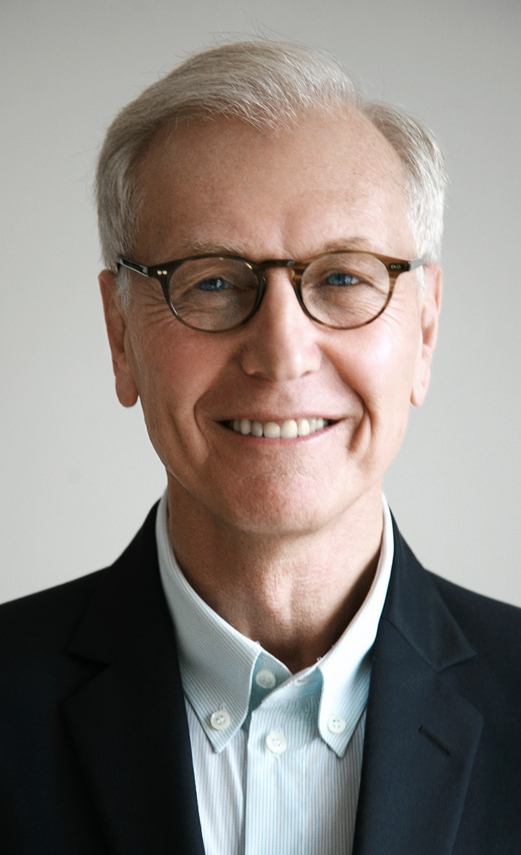
- Occupations: Author, Psychotherapist, Lecturer, Professor
- Writing career
- Notable works: The Patient Who Cured His Therapist and Other Unconventional Stories Of Therapy, Uncharted Lives: Understanding The Life Passages Of Gay Men
- Website: stanley-siegel.com

Stanley Siegel, LCSW, is a psychotherapist, author, lecturer, and former Director of Education and Senior Faculty member of New York's Ackerman Institute for Family Therapy.

After creating and writing the "Families" column for Newsday he went on to co-author two books: The Patient Who Cured His Therapist and Other Unconventional Stories Of Therapy (Penguin/Dutton 1992; Penguin/Plume, 1993; Marlowe and company, 1999) and Uncharted Lives: Understanding The Life Passages Of Gay Men (Penguin/Dutton, 1994; Penguin/Plume 1995) which have been translated into 5 languages.

With over 36 years of experience in the field of psychology, Siegel developed an approach to psychotherapy, leading to his book Your Brain on Sex: How Smarter Sex Can Change Your Life, released in October, 2011.

Siegel has taught at the State University of New York at Stony Brook, Adelphi University, and the University of California, Berkeley; was the founding Director of the Family Studies Center in Huntington, New York, and has served as a consultant to hospitals and mental health centers throughout the country.

Regularly quoted in the media, he has appeared on ABC's Good Morning America several times, as well as many other television and radio programs, and has acted as a consultant for film and television. Siegel was invited on The Oprah Winfrey Show to discuss "How Healers Heal Themselves."

He served as the Dance Editor of Show Business magazine, writing weekly dance reviews and reporting on the contemporary dance scene.

His daughter, Alyssa Siegel, LPC lives in Portland, Oregon and is a contributor to Your Brain on Sex.

He lives in Los Angeles.
