= Roth Pond Regatta =

Annual boat race in Stony Brook, New York

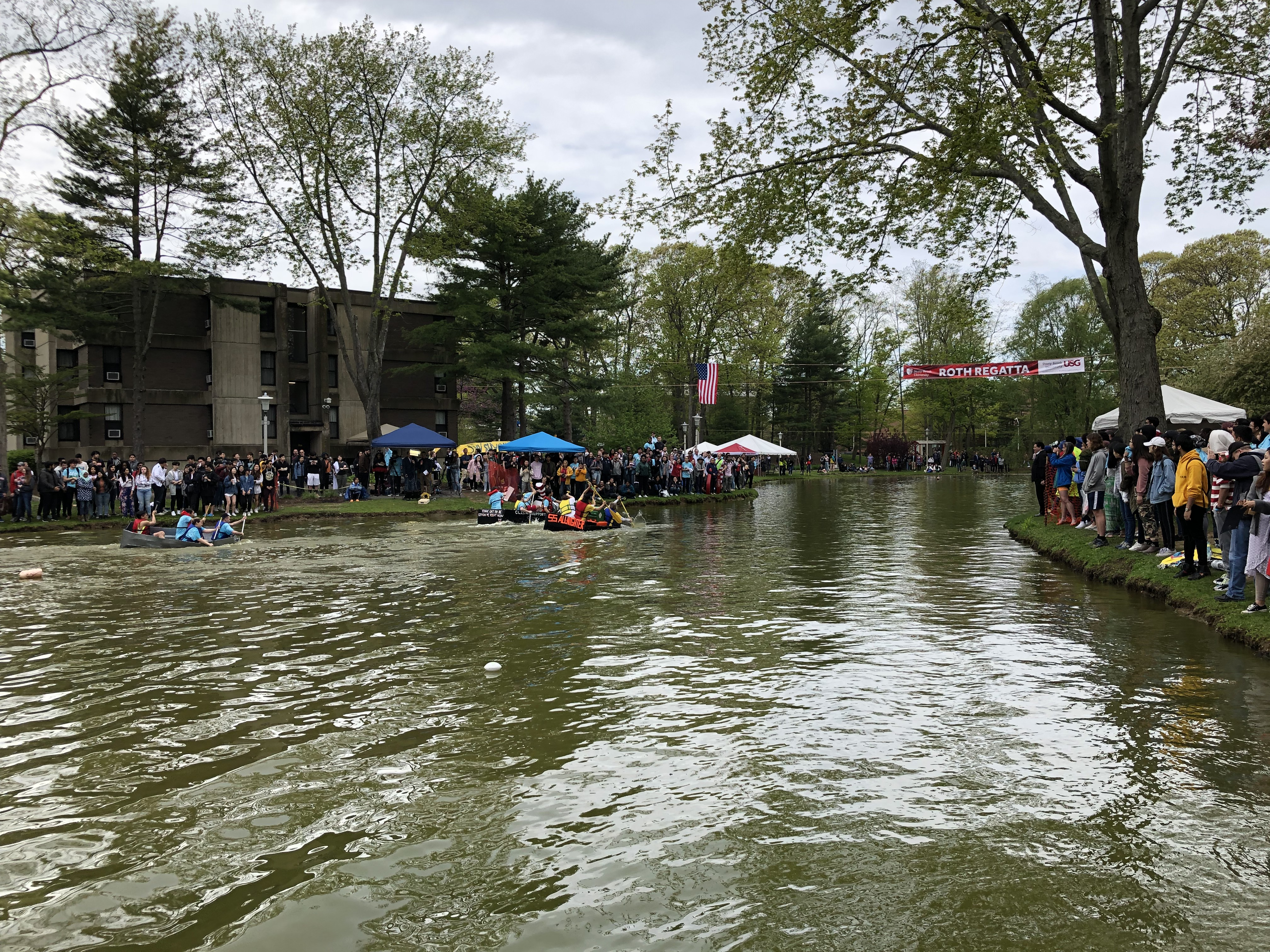
2019 Roth Regatta

The Roth Pond Regatta, commonly known as the Roth Regatta, is a boat race held at Stony Brook University's Roth Pond. The event, held annually since 1989, involves teams of boat racers working towards the common goal of getting from one side of Roth Pond to the other. What makes the event challenging, however, is the strict restriction on the materials that contestants can use.

== History ==
The tradition started in 1989, when the Roth Quad Yacht Club published an article in The Stony Brook Statesman declaring the date, rules and goal of the competition. The original event was supposed to take place during the 1988 Roth Quad Olympics as part of a boating/sailing section, but the olympics did not occur that year. The yacht club decided to hold the regatta as a stand-alone event which would "be the opening event if [the Roth olympics] do take place".

The Roth Regatta is now traditionally held during the last Friday of April and run by the Undergraduate Student Government at Stony Brook, since the absorption of the Roth Yachting club by USG.

== Rules ==
=== Types of boats ===
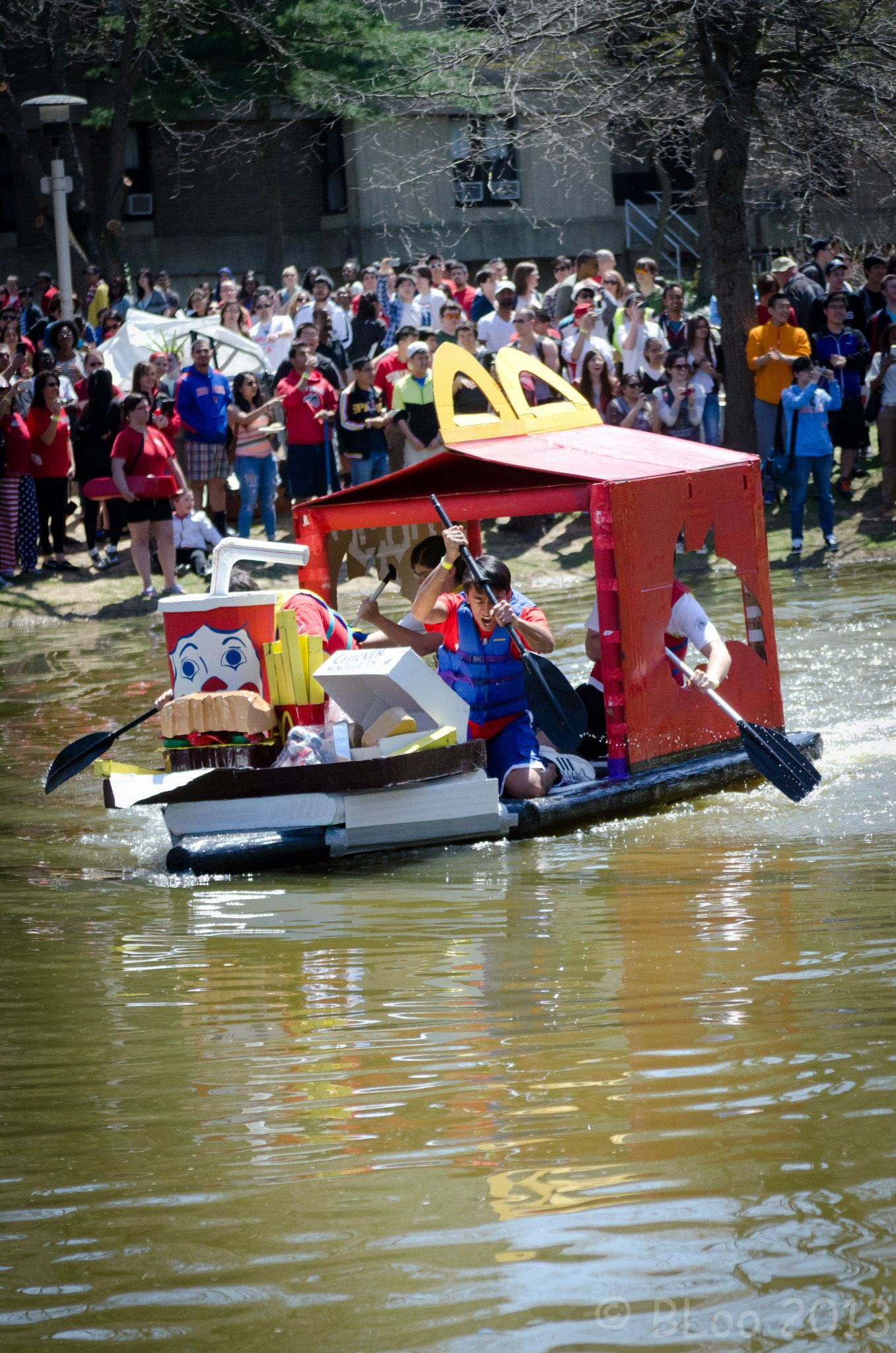
A yacht class boat at the 2013 Roth Pond Regatta

The judging is split up between two different types of boats: Speedsters and Yachts. The difference between the two categories is that speedsters can hold a maximum of two team members. Yachts hold between three and five team members. In either category, those who start the race in the boat must stay in the boat until it crosses the finish line. This is so that, among other things, speed isn't gained by a member pushing off the boat as they leave, and so that boats entered as yachts don't finish as speedsters.

=== Materials ===
The rules for the Roth pond regatta have changed since the first. Currently, the rules state that all boats must be made of only cardboard, duct tape and paint. Any string, glue, and cellophane may only be used for decorative purposes. Initially, the rules were broad, and only barred specific materials such as styrofoam, metal, wood and glass. As late as 2009, the rules allowed for cloth sails and string for construction.

=== Eligibility ===
Boats are only eligible to race if they meet the material requirements (see above) and if they fit the dimensions given by the rules. Traditionally, these are a maximum length of 20 feet, a maximum width of 15 feet and a minimum volume of 3 cubic feet per crew member.

=== Judging ===
There are three prizes for the winners of the regatta.

- The Roth Pond Cup is awarded to the Yacht Class winner.
- The Seawolf Cup is awarded to the Speedster Class winner.
- The Staller Cup is awarded to the Best of Show.

The Roth and Seawolf cups go to the fastest boats in each category

The best of show has an additional basis for judging. The boats that are judged highest in apparent seaworthiness, appearance and originality are considered. Costumes worn by the crew may also be judged. The design of the boat and costumes must also pertain to the specific theme of the regatta for that year. The themes for the past few years have been:

2004 (three listed winners): 1) Radar Schmadar; 2) Santa's Crunked Sleigh; 3) Cristina T
2009: Ancient Civilizations
2010: Disney vs. Warner Brothers
2011: Superheroes and Villains
2012: The 1990s
2013: 'MURICA
2014: (25th anniversary) Video games and Apps
2015: Fantasy
2016: Under the Sea and Far Beyond
2017: Superheroes & Supervillians
2018: Cartoon Network vs. Nickelodeon
2019: (30th Anniversary) Dr. Seuss
