= Katherine Aubrecht =

American chemist

- Education: Cornell University
- Scientific career
- Thesis: Solution structures of lithium monoalkyl- and dialkylamides, solution structures and reactivity of lithium phenylacetylide in the presence of a Lewis acid (1999)

Katherine Brooke Aubrecht is a chemist at Stony Brook university who is known for her work on sustainable materials, especially biodegradable polymers. She is an elected fellow of the American Association for the Advancement of Science.

== Education and career ==
Aubrecht received her B.A. from Reed College in 1992. She has an M.S. (1996) and a Ph.D. (1999) from Cornell University. As of 2025 Aubrecht is an associate professor at Stony Brook University.

== Selected publications ==
- Aubrecht, Katherine B.; Chang, Karen; Hillmyer, Marc A.; Tolman, William B. (2001). "Lactide polymerization activity of alkoxide, phenoxide, and amide derivatives of yttrium(III) arylamidinates". Journal of Polymer Science Part A: Polymer Chemistry. 39 (2): 284–293. doi:10.1002/1099-0518(20010115)39:2<284::AID-POLA40>3.0.CO;2-C. ISSN 1099-0518.
- Yang, Rui; Aubrecht, Katherine B.; Ma, Hongyang; Wang, Ran; Grubbs, Robert B.; Hsiao, Benjamin S.; Chu, Benjamin (March 10, 2014). "Thiol-modified cellulose nanofibrous composite membranes for chromium (VI) and lead (II) adsorption". Polymer. 55 (5): 1167–1176. doi:10.1016/j.polymer.2014.01.043. ISSN 0032-3861.
- Aubrecht, Katherine B.; Bourgeois, Marie; Brush, Edward J.; MacKellar, Jennifer; Wissinger, Jane E. (December 10, 2019). "Integrating Green Chemistry in the Curriculum: Building Student Skills in Systems Thinking, Safety, and Sustainability". Journal of Chemical Education. 96 (12): 2872–2880. doi:10.1021/acs.jchemed.9b00354. ISSN 0021-9584.

== Awards and honors ==
Aubrecht was announced as a fellow of the American Association for the Advancement of Science in 2025.
