= List of Stony Brook University people =

This is a list of people connected to Stony Brook University.

== University presidents ==
| Name | Years served |
|---|---|
| Dr. John Francis Lee | 1961 |
| Dr. John S. Toll | 1965–1978 |
| Dr. John Marburger III | 1980–1994 |
| Dr. Shirley Strum Kenny | 1994–2009 |
| Dr. Samuel L. Stanley | 2009–2019 |
| Dr. Maurie D. McInnis | July 1, 2020 – present |

== Notable faculty ==
This list includes both present and former faculty members.

| Name | Known for | Relationship to Stony Brook |
|---|---|---|
| Thomas J. J. Altizer | Literary critic, philosopher and theologian | Professor emeritus of Religious Studies |
| Saïd Amir Arjomand | Sociologist, author | Distinguished Service Professor Emeritus |
| Robert Aumann | Nobel laureate in economics | Visiting Leading Professor; founding member of Center for Game Theory in Economics |
| Amiri Baraka | Poet, playwright, activist | Professor emeritus, Department of Africana Studies |
| Laurence Baxter | Statistician | |
| Jorge Benach | Microbiology, helped discover causative agent of Lyme disease | Professor, director of the Stony Brook Center for Infectious Diseases, and chair of the Department of Molecular Genetics and Microbiology |
| Paul M. Bingham | Molecular biologist, evolutionary biologist, and vice president for Research at Cornerstone Pharmaceuticals | Professor in the Department of Biochemistry and Cell Biology in the School of Medicine |
| Justus Buchler | Philosopher and metaphysician | Professor emeritus in the Department of Philosophy |
| Martin Canin | Pianist | Artist-in-residence, Music Department at the Staller Center (1965–1993) |
| Jeff Cheeger | Mathematician; recipient of the Sloan Research Fellowship (1971–1973); Guggenheim Fellowship (1984), elected to the United States National Academy of Sciences (1997); received the Oswald Veblen Prize in Geometry (2001) | Professor, Department of Mathematics (1969–1992) |
| William Chittick | Author of numerous books on Sufism and Islamic philosophy | Distinguished Professor, Department of Asian and Asian American Studies |
| Richard Clark | Dermatologist, biomedical engineer | Professor, Health Sciences Center |
| Rose Laub Coser | Sociologist; vice-president of the American Sociological Association; president of the Eastern Sociological Society; contribution to medical sociology, role theory, and sociology of the family | Professor emeritus of Sociology |
| Joanne Davila | Clinical psychologist | Professor, Department of Psychology |
| Simon Donaldson | Mathematician, Fields Medallist (1986), Shaw Prize recipient (2009), Breakthrough Prize laureate (2014) | Permanent member, Simons Center for Geometry and Physics |
| Lawrence Dutton | Violist, Emerson String Quartet, 1977–present | Artist-in-residence, Music Department at the Staller Center |
| Thomas Flanagan | Writer, National Book Critics Circle Award winner (1979) | Professor, Department of English (1978–1996) |
| Douglas J. Futuyma | Evolutionary biologist, member of the United States National Academy of Sciences | Professor, Department of Ecology and Evolution |
| John Gagnon | Sociologist, pioneer in the field of human sexuality | Professor, Department of Sociology (1968–1998) |
| Richard J. Gambino | Materials science; recipient of the National Medal of Technology, 1995; helped invent magnetic materials used for erasable optical data storage | Professor of Materials Science and engineering |
| H. Bentley Glass | Geneticist | |
| James Glimm | Mathematician; president of the American Mathematical Society; member of the United States National Academy of Sciences; recipient of the National Medal of Science | Former chairman, Department of Applied Mathematics |
| Mark Granovetter | Sociologist, the author of The Strength of Weak Ties | Associate to full professor of Sociology in 1977–1992 |
| George W. Hart | Artist | Professor of Computer Science |
| Robert Harvey | Literary theorist, philosopher | Distinguished University Professor |
| Benjamin Hsiao | Materials scientist, fellow of the American Physical Society, fellow of the American Chemical Society, fellow of the American Association for the Advancement of Science | Chief research officer and vice-president of Research (2012– ) |
| Don Ihde | Philosopher of science | Professor emeritus in the Department of Philosophy |
| Masayori Inouye | Researcher in antisense RNA | Professor, Department of Biochemistry and Cell Biology |
| Jukka Jernvall | Research in mammalian dentition | Research professor of Evolutionary Developmental Biology |
| Lowell E. Jones | Co-creator of the Farrell–Jones conjecture | Professor |
| Allan Kaprow | Developer of Happenings | Department of Fine Arts, 1961–1968; professor |
| Alfred Kazin | Writer, literary critic, and winner of the first Truman Capote Lifetime Achievement Award in Literary Criticism | Distinguished Professor, Department of English (1963–?) |
| Michael Kimmel | Sociologist | Professor in the Department of Social Sciences |
| Lee Koppelman | Executive director of the Long Island Regional Planning Board | Director of Stony Brook University's Center for Regional Policy Studies |
| Ron Kovic | Writer, anti-war activist, author of Born on the Fourth of July | Writer-in-residence (1983) |
| Donald Kuspit | Art critic | |
| Paul Lauterbur | Nobel Prize in Physiology or Medicine 2003 for work in developing magnetic resonance imaging | Professor, Department of Chemistry and Radiology (1969–1985) |
| Richard Leakey | Paleontologist and conservationist | Visiting professor of Anthropology |
| Benjamin Whisoh Lee | Theoretical physicist, head of theoretical research group at Fermilab who was influential in the development of Standard Model | Professor of Physics |
| Daniel Levy | Sociologist | Professor in the Department of Sociology |
| Marci Lobel | Health psychologist, known for her research on women's reproductive health | Professor of Psychology, senior researcher and director of the Stress and Reproduction (STAR) Lab |
| John Marburger III | Physicist; director of Brookhaven National Laboratory; science advisor to former President George W. Bush | University president (1980–1994) |
| Dusa McDuff | Mathematician, fellow of the Royal Society, 1994 | |
| Lynne Meadow | Theatrical director of the Manhattan Theatre Club | |
| Emil Wolfgang Menzel, Jr. | Communication and cognition of chimpanzees | Professor of psychology |
| John Milnor | Mathematician; Fields Medal winner (1962); Abel Prize laureate (2011); member of US National Academy of Sciences; recipient of the National Medal of Science; Wolf Prize laureate; three-time winner of the AMS Steele Prize in mathematics | Director, Institute for Mathematical Sciences at Stony Brook |
| Joseph S. B. Mitchell | Computer scientist; mathematician; Gödel Prize (2010); ACM fellow | Professor of Applied Mathematics and Statistics and research professor of Computer Science at Stony Brook University |
| Homer A. Neal | Particle physicist | Provost (1981–1986) |
| Patrice Nganang | | Associate professor of Comparative Literature |
| Andrew J. Nicholson | Indologist, scholar of Hinduism | Associate professor, Department of Asian and Asian American Studies |
| Mel Pekarsky | Artist | Professor emeritus and visiting professor, Department of Art |
| Massimo Pigliucci | Author, evolutionary biologist | Former professor of ecology and evolution |
| Philip Roth | Author | Visiting lecturer (1967–68) |
| Jim Simons | Recipient of the Oswald Veblen Prize in Geometry; member of the US National Academy of Sciences; founder of Renaissance Technologies; philanthropist; benefactor of Stony Brook and other universities | Former chairman, Department of Mathematics |
| Louis Simpson | Pulitzer Prize-winning poet | Distinguished Professor Emeritus, Department of English |
| Dennis Sullivan | Mathematician; recipient of the Oswald Veblen Prize in Geometry, the Prix Élie Cartan of the French Academy of Sciences, the King Faisal International Prize for Science, the National Medal of Science, the AMS Steele Prize, the Balzan Prize and the Wolf Prize | |
| Esther Takeuchi | Chemist | Distinguished Professor, College of Engineering and Applied Sciences |
| George C. Williams | Author, evolutionary biologist | Professor of biology |
| Eckard Wimmer | | Distinguished Professor |
| Patricia Wright | Primatologist, physical anthropologist | Distinguished Service Professor, Department of Anthropology, and director, Institute for the Conservation of Tropical Environments |
| Chen Ning Yang | Nobel Prize in Physics, 1957, shared with Tsung-Dao Lee for work on weak nuclear forces and parity | Professor (1965–1999) |
| Shing-Tung Yau | Fields Medal-winning mathematician (1982) | Assistant professor (1972–1974) |

== Notable alumni ==
| Name | Known for | Relationship to Stony Brook |
|---|---|---|
| Chris Algieri | Professional boxer, former WBO junior welterweight title holder | B.S., Health Care Science |
| Craig Allen | WCBS-TV and WCBS-AM meteorologist | B.S., Meteorology |
| Scott Amron | Conceptual artist and electrical engineer | B.E., Electrical Engineering |
| Michael R. Anastasio | Director of the Lawrence Livermore National Laboratory | M.A., PhD, Theoretical Nuclear Physics |
| Kenneth Andrews | Sociologist | PhD, 1997 |
| Babette Babich | Philosopher and professor of Philosophy at Fordham University | B.A., 1980 |
| Kim Barnes Arico | Current head women's basketball coach at the University of Michigan | Attended and played basketball in 1988–89 (transferred to Montclair State University) |
| Joy Behar | Comedian, TV personality, talk show host | M.A., English Education |
| Heather A. Berlin | Neuroscientist, science communicator, TV show host | B.S., Psychology, Fine Art, Pre-Med |
| Thomas S. Bianchi | Oceanographer, Biogeochemist, book author | M.A., Biology – Ecology and Evolution, 1981 |
| Mark Bridges | Costume designer | B.A., Theater Arts, 1983 |
| Peter Bucknell | Classical violist | D.M. |
| Dipankar Chatterji | Molecular biologist, recipient of Padma Shri and Shanti Swarup Bhatnagar Prize | Post-doctoral studies, 1979 |
| Santanu Chaudhuri | Researcher and director of Manufacturing Science and engineering, Argonne National Laboratory | PhD, Computational and Materials Chemistry |
| Dan Clawson | Sociologist and labor activist | PhD, Sociology, 1978 |
| Errol Cockfield Jr. | Press secretary to the governor of New York | B.A., English, 1994 |
| Daniel Corbett | BBC weather forecaster | B.S., Meteorology |
| Eric Corley | Radio show host and publisher of 2600: The Hacker Quarterly magazine | |
| Steve Cuozzo | New York Post writer/editor | B.A., English, 1971 |
| Jane Delgado | President and CEO of National Alliance for Hispanic Health | PhD, Clinical Psychology, 1981 |
| Glenn Dubin | Billionaire, co-founder and CEO of Highbridge Capital Management | B.A., Economics, 1978 |
| Diane Farr | Author and actress, best known as Megan on NUMB3RS on CBS | B.A., 1995 |
| Gene Carl Feldman | Oceanographer, NASA/Goddard Space Flight Center | PhD, 1985 |
| Mitchell B. Fox | Group president of Conde Nast Publications | B.S., Political Science |
| Robert J. Frey | Research professor at Stony Brook University, former MD of Renaissance Technologies | B.S., 1980; PhD, 1986., Applied Mathematics |
| Robert Gallucci | Former ambassador; served as dean of the Edmund A. Walsh School of Foreign Service at Georgetown University | B.A., 1967 |
| Steven K. Galson | Acting Surgeon General of the United States, acting assistant secretary for Health | B.A., Biology, 1978 |
| David Gelernter | Professor at Yale University | PhD, Computer Science |
| Richard Gelfond | CEO of IMAX Corporation | B.A., 1976 |
| Christine Goerke | Opera singer | B.A. |
| Ned Goldreyer | Television writer | B.A. |
| Stuart Goldstein | Squash player | |
| Edward Guiliano | President of New York Institute of Technology | PhD |
| Jai Gulati | Businessman, CEO of Systel | B.A., 2002 |
| Vi Hart | Mathematician | |
| John L. Hennessy | Former president of Stanford University and 2017 Turing Award recipient | M.A., PhD, Computer Science |
| Scott Higham | Investigative journalist for The Washington Post and winner of the 2002 Pulitzer Prize | |
| Mitch Horowitz | PEN Award-winning historian and former vice-president, Penguin Random House | B.A, 1988 |
| Hao Huang | Concert pianist and professor at Scripps College | D.M.A. in piano performance |
| Jainendra K. Jain | Erwin W. Mueller Professor of Physics at Pennsylvania State University | PhD, 1985 |
| Chanda Jog | Astrophysicist at the Indian Institute of Science | PhD, 1982 |
| Suzanne Bennett Johnson | Former president of the American Psychological Association | PhD, 1974 |
| Perry Kivolowitz | Academy Award for Scientific and Technical Achievement winner | B.S. 1981, Computer Science |
| Adam Klein | Opera singer | B.A. |
| Joseph E. LeDoux | Neuroscientist | PhD, 1977 |
| Kevin Kwan Loucks | International concert pianist | D.M.A. in piano performance |
| Michael Lowenstern | Grammy award-winning bass clarinetist, composer, and founder of Earspasm | M.M., 1992, D.M.A., 1999 |
| Nick Mamatas | Author | B.A., 1992 |
| Doug McAdam | Sociologist | PhD, 1979 |
| Kathleen M. McGarry | Economist at the University of California, Los Angeles | B.A., 1986; PhD, 1992 |
| Fulvio Melia | Author, physicist, and astrophysicist at the University of Arizona | M.S., 1980 |
| Steffen Mueller | Microbiologist | PhD, 2002 |
| Sunil Mukhi | Fellow of the Indian Academy of Sciences and the Indian National Science Academy and a recipient of the S.S. Bhatnagar Award for Physical Sciences | PhD, Theoretical Physics |
| Momina Mustehsan | Singer, songwriter and social activist | B.S., Biomedical engineering and Applied Mathematics |
| Horațiu Năstase | Physicist | PhD, 2000 |
| Joe Nathan | Major league pitcher, mainly for the Minnesota Twins | B.S., Business management, 1997 |
| James S. Olson | Historian | PhD |
| Jon Oringer | Billionaire, founder and CEO of Shutterstock | B.S., Computer Science 1997, B.S., Mathematics 1997 |
| Sandy Pearlman | Rock music promoter | B.A., 1965, 1966 |
| Hanspeter Pfister | Computer scientist | PhD, 1996 |
| Nan Phinney | Accelerator physicist at Stanford Linear Collider | PhD, 1972 |
| Walter W. Powell | Sociologist | PhD, 1978 |
| Joshua Prager | Director of Center for Rehabilitation of Pain Syndromes at David Geffen School of Medicine at UCLA; president of North American Neuromodulation Society | M.D., M.S., B.S. 1972 Stony Brook's SAB Concert chairman |
| Petar Rakovic | Professional soccer player | |
| Sumathi Rao | Professor of Physics at Harish-Chandra Research Institute | PhD Physics 1983 |
| Jef Raskin | Author, and co-creator of the Macintosh computer at Apple Computer, Inc. | B.S., 1964; B.A., 1965 |
| Dominick Reyes | Professional mixed martial artist competing in the UFC | B.S., Information Systems, 2013 |
| Burton Rocks | Writer, sports agent at C.L. Rocks Corporation | B.A. History, 1994 (magna cum laude) |
| Alia Sabur | World's youngest college professor (age 18), B.S. at age 14 | B.S. 2003 Applied Mathematics summa cum laude |
| Laura Schlessinger | Commentator, host of the Dr. Laura radio call-in show | B.S., 1968 |
| Randall L. Schweller | Professor of Political Science at Ohio State University | B.A., 1984 |
| Andrew Sega | Musician and software engineer | B.S., Computer Science / Philosophy |
| Lasana M. Sekou | Poet, author, founder of House of Nehesi Publishers | B.A., 1982, Political Science / International Relations |
| Ashoke Sen | Distinguished Professor at Harish-Chandra Research Institute, Allahabad; winner of Fundamental Physics Prize | PhD, Theoretical Physics |
| Abraham Silberschatz | Professor and chair of the Computer Science department at Yale University | |
| Isabel Soveral | Composer | |
| Jason Stanley | Jacob Urowsky Professor of Philosophy at Yale University | B.A., 1990 |
| Michael Stebbins | Geneticist | PhD |
| Henry Swieca | Billionaire, co-founder and former CIO of Highbridge Capital Management | B.A., 1979 |
| Michelle Tokarczyk | Author, poet, and professor of English at Goucher College | PhD, 1986 |
| Douglas Vakoch | President of METI (Messaging Extraterrestrial Intelligence), astrobiologist | PhD, Psychology, 1996 |
| Susan R. Wessler | Molecular biologist and geneticist | B.A., 1974 |
| Guoliang Yu | Powell Chair in Mathematics at Texas A&M University | PhD, 1991 |
