= McGarry =

McGarry is a surname of Irish origin meaning "the son of Fearadhach." It is the 422nd most common surname in Ireland, and 722nd in Scotland.

== List of people surnamed McGarry ==
- Andrew McGarry (born 1981), English cricketer
- Anna McGarry (1894–1978), leading U.S. advocate in interracial justice and veteran social action leader
- Bill McGarry (1927–2005), English international football player and manager
- Chris McGarry (born 1966), American actor
- Christi McGarry, Filipina-American beauty pageant titleholder from Jersey City, New Jersey
- Colin McGarry (born 1965), Northern Irish professional darts player
- Fearghal McGarry (born 1971), an Irish historian
- Flynn McGarry (born 1998), American chef
- James McGarry (hurler) (born 1971), Irish hurling player
- Jean McGarry, author of fiction and professor in the Writing Seminars program at Johns Hopkins University
- John McGarry (born 1957), Northern Irish political scientist
- Kathleen M. McGarry, professor of health economics at the University of California, Los Angeles
- Kathryn McGarry, Canadian politician, Mayor-elect of Cambridge, Ontario, formerly a critical care nurse
- Kelly McGarry (1982-2016), professional New Zealand freeride mountain biker and X-Games athlete
- Mac McGarry (1926–2013), host of the U.S. television quiz show It's Academic
- Mary McGarry Morris (born 1943), American novelist, short story author and playwright
- Michael McGarry (born 1965), New Zealand international soccer player
- Moses Elijah McGarry (1878–1949), physician and political figure in Nova Scotia, Canada
- Natalie McGarry (born 1981), Scottish politician
- Niall McGarry (born 1978), Irish businessman
- Patrick Michael McGarry (1931-2021), Staffordshire Moorlands District Council Chairman and Checkley Parish Councillor, cricketer and shop owner of Tean, Staffordshire
- Patsy McGarry, Religious Affairs correspondent of The Irish Times in the Republic of Ireland
- Peter J. McGarry (1871–1940), New York politician
- Robert McGarry IV (born 1985), collegiate American football player
- Ron McGarry (born 1937), English professional footballer who played centre forward for a number of clubs
- Ryan McGarry (physician) (born c. 1983) ER doctor and documentary film-maker
- Sandy McGarry (born 1961) South Carolina House of Representatives member
- Seán McGarry (fl. 1908–1925), Irish nationalist and politician
- Steve McGarry (born 1953), British cartoonist
- Steven McGarry (born 1979), Scottish professional footballer
- Thomas McGarry, early 20th-century Canadian politician
- Tim McGarry (born 1964), Northern Irish actor and comedian

== Fictional characters ==
- Leo McGarry, character played by John Spencer on the television serial drama The West Wing

PC McGarry number 452 from BBC Children's TV shows Camberwick Green and Trumpton

== See also ==
- McGarry, Ontario, township in Timiskaming District in the Canadian province of Ontario
