= Dominique Barber =

American football player and administrator (born 1986)

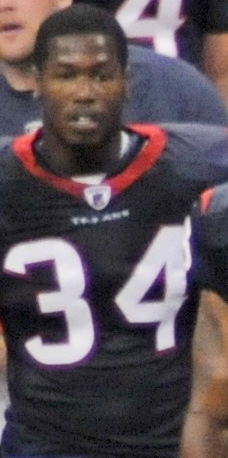
- Barber in 2010

Minnesota Golden Gophers
- Title: Coord. of alumni outreach relations/NFL liaison/Recruiting assistant

Personal information
- Born: August 2, 1986 (age 40); Plymouth, Minnesota, U.S.
- Listed height: 6 ft 0 in (1.83 m)
- Listed weight: 210 lb (95 kg)

Career information
- Position: Defensive back (No. 34)
- High school: Wayzata (Plymouth)
- College: Minnesota
- NFL draft: 2008: 6th round, 173rd overall pick

Career history

Playing
- Houston Texans (2008–2011)

Operations
- Minnesota (2017–present) Coord. of alumni outreach relations / NFL liaison / Recruiting assistant

Awards and highlights
- Second-team All-Big Ten (2007)

Career NFL statistics
- Total tackles: 57
- Sacks: 1
- Fumble recoveries: 1
- Interceptions: 1
- Defensive touchdowns: 1
- Stats at Pro Football Reference

Dominique Jermaine Barber (born August 2, 1986) is an American former professional football player who was a safety for the Houston Texans of the National Football League (NFL). He played college football for the Minnesota Golden Gophers and was selected by the Texans in the sixth round of the 2008 NFL draft.

He is the son of former NFL running back Marion Barber, Jr., younger brother of former NFL running back Marion Barber III and older brother of Minnesota Golden Gophers linebacker Thomas Barber. His cousin is Peyton Barber who was an NFL running back.

== Early life ==
A 2004 graduate of Wayzata High School. Rivals.com ranked Barber as the 42nd-best player at his position in 2003. He was selected for the SuperPrep Midwest Team and ranked as the 58th-best player. He was also selected as a PrepStar All-Midwest Region. Barber was named all-state and all-county his senior season at defensive back and was an all-conference and all-area selection his senior season at running back. He recorded one interception, which he returned for a touchdown in 2003. He also rushed for 911 yards on 138 carries with nine scores his last season, while also recording 25 catches for 288 yards with three touchdowns. While at Wayzata, he also lettered twice in hockey and once in baseball.

== College career ==
In 2004, Barber played in nine games, recording four tackles and one pass breakup. He also joined Robert McGarry and Gary Russell as the only Gophers to letter as true freshmen. His father, Marion Jr. and brother, Marion III also lettered as true freshmen. He also recorded one tackle against Alabama in the Music City Bowl.

In 2005, Barber appeared in all 12 games, finishing the season with 13 tackles and a blocked punt against Colorado State, which resulted in a touchdown by Alex Daniels. Barber also recorded three tackles, against Virginia in the Music City Bowl. He also earned a second letter, in 2005.

In 2006, Barber was named All-Big Ten Honorable Mention by the media. He also established career-highs in every statistical category. He also tied for fifth in the conference with 0.31 interceptions per game. He made his first career start in the season opener at Kent State. Barber intercepted the first pass of his career against Temple. At Purdue, Barber held the wide receiver Dorien Bryant to just 59 yards receiving on six catches, he also broke up two passes. He also, established a new career high with eight tackles vs. Penn State. Also, recorded career firsts with a fumble recovery and a blocked PAT at the top-ranked Ohio State. Against Indiana, Barber returned an interception 45 yards for a touchdown, broke up another pass and forced the first fumble of his career. At Michigan State, he picked off a career-high two passes. His interception of MSU quarterback Brian Hoyer’s pass in the end zone on the first play of the second quarter turned the momentum of the game. He also, had six tackles in the Insight Bowl against Texas Tech. In 2006, Barber also, earned a third letter.

In 2007, Dominique started all 12 games. He was named to the All-Big Ten second team after leading the team with 100 tackles.

=== College statistics ===
Season	Team	GP	Tackles				Interceptions			Fumbles		
Season	Team	GP	Cmb	Solo	Ast	Sck	PD	Int	TD	FF	FR	Blk
2004	Minnesota	9	4	2	2	0.0	1	0	0	0	0	0
2005	Minnesota	12	13	10	3	0.0	0	0	0	0	0	1
2006	Minnesota	13	74	33	41	0.0	4	4	1	2	1	1
2007	Minnesota	12	100	–	–	0.0	8	0	0	0	0	0
Total		46	191	45	46	0.0	13	4	1	2	1	2

== Professional career ==
Pre-draft measurables
Height	Weight	Arm length	Hand span	40-yard dash	10-yard split	20-yard split	20-yard shuttle	Three-cone drill	Vertical jump	Broad jump	Bench press
6 ft 0 1/4 in (1.84 m)	210 lb (95 kg)	31 7/8 in (0.81 m)	8 7/8 in (0.23 m)	4.70 s	1.58 s	2.70 s	4.34 s	7.08 s	34.0 in (0.86 m)	9 ft 9 in (2.97 m)	23 reps
All values from NFL Combine

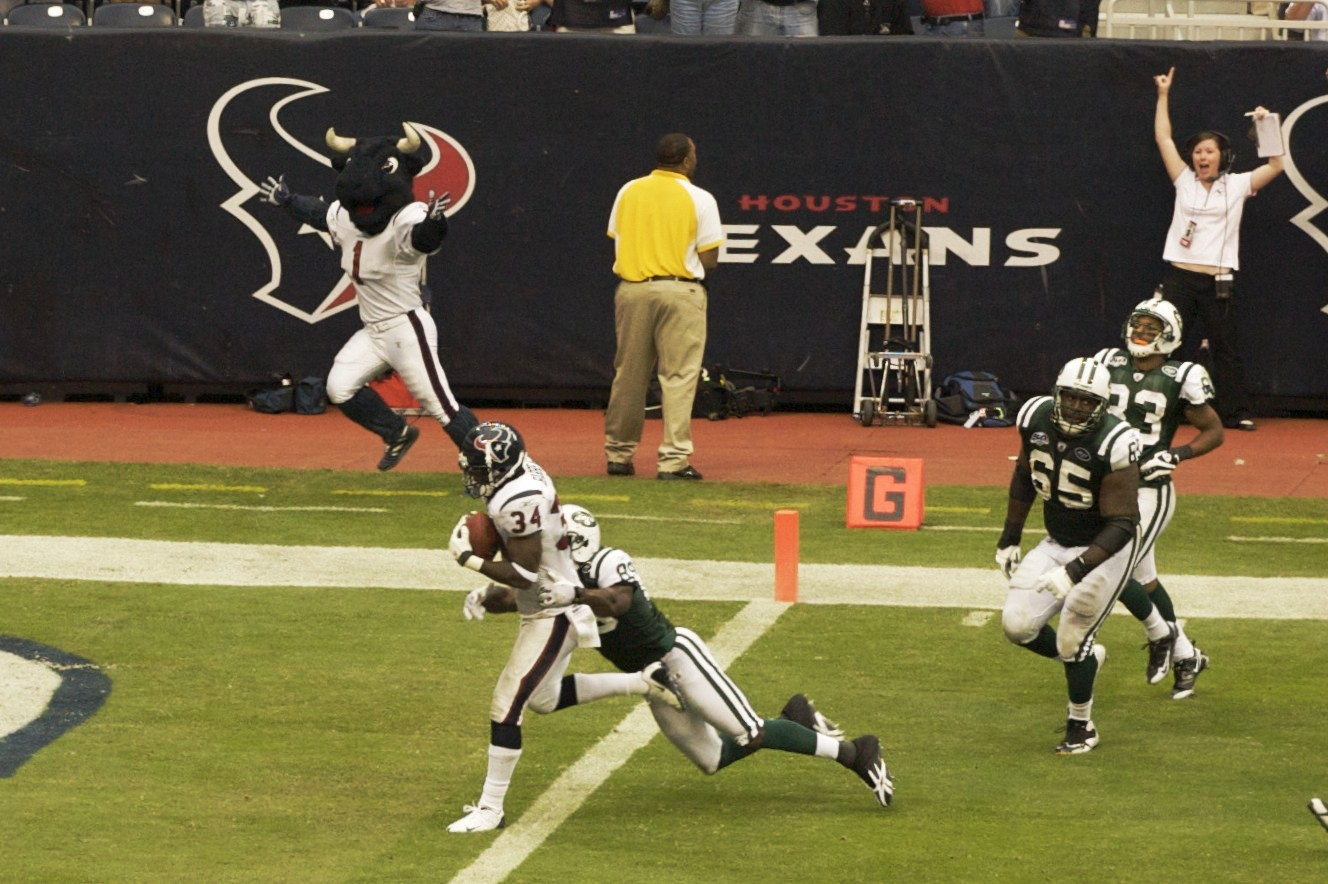
Barber returns a fumble for a touchdown during the September 2009 game against the Jets.

Barber was selected in the sixth round (173rd overall) of the 2008 NFL draft by the Houston Texans. He appeared in 12 games (no starts) his rookie season, recording 15 tackles, a sack, and a pass deflection.

Barber played in 13 games (six starts) for the Texans in 2009 before being placed on injured reserve with a hamstring injury on December 2. He finished the season with 33 tackles and his first career interception.

== Post-professional career ==
Barber would join the coaching staff at his alma mater under head coach Jerry Kill in 2014.
