= Raković =

Raković is a surname. Notable people with the surname include:

- Aleksandar Raković (born 1968), Serbian racewalker
- Ermin Rakovič (born 1977), Slovenian footballer
- Kristina Raković (born 1994), Montenegrin basketball player
- Luka Raković (born 1988), Croatian handball player
- Milovan Raković (born 1985), Serbian basketball player
- Petar Raković (born 1984), Serbian footballer
- Predrag Raković (1912–1944), Yugoslav military officer
- Savo Raković (born 1985), Serbian footballer
