= Amron =

Amron is a surname and male given name. Notable people with the name include:

- Alan Amron (born 1948), American inventor
- Amrom Harry Katz (1915–1997), American physicist
- Scott Amron (born 1985), American conceptual artist and electrical engineer
