= Frank Melville Jr. Memorial Library =

Coordinates: 40.91557°N 73.12273°W

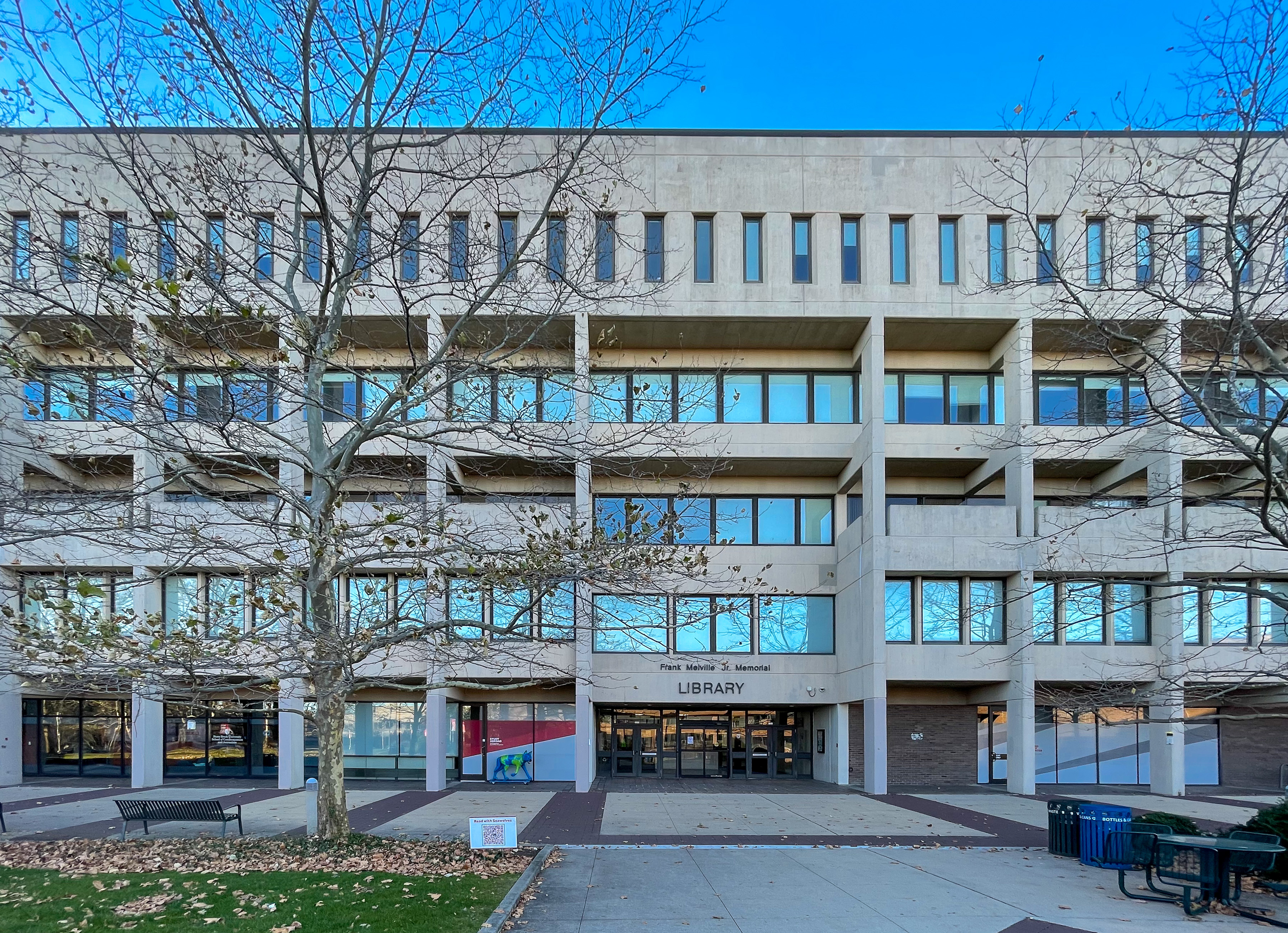
- East entrance
- Former names: State University Library (1963–70)

General information
- Type: Library
- Location: 100 Nicolls Road; Stony Brook, New York, 11794
- Named for: Frank Melville Jr.
- Construction started: 1962
- Opened: July 1963
- Owner: Stony Brook University

Design and construction
- Architecture firm: Damaz-Pokorny-Weigel

The Frank Melville Jr. Memorial Library is the main library at Stony Brook University in Stony Brook, New York. It is named for the father of philanthropist Ward Melville, who donated 400 acres of land and money to establish Stony Brook University in 1957. It originally opened in July 1963 and has massively expanded since its original construction. The library was dedicated to Melville in 1971.

The library currently holds over two million volumes, over 300 databases, 70,000 electronic journals, 10,000 electronic books, 10,000 compact disks and 6,000 films. The six-story building encompasses roughly 682,000 square feet of space and is in use by over fifty different administrative and academic departments. Numerous retail companies ranging from Shop Red West (one of the university's bookstores) to Starbucks are housed in the Melville Library.

== History ==
Originally constructed in 1962 as a modest sized three-story building, the library opened its doors as the State University Library in July 1963 with capacity for 700 students. It was renovated almost immediately with numerous construction projects shortly after; in 1967, work began on the "Bridge to Nowhere", connecting the library to the Stony Brook Union. Plans to connect the two buildings with the Fine Arts Center were not completed until 10 years after ground was broken, giving the structure its name. The Bridge to Nowhere was completed in 1977 and demolished in 2002.

In 1969, architect Ervin Y. Galantay spearheaded a new design for the library, adding four separate five-story wings around the original structure as well as a glass atrium that connected the original building to its new areas. After another massive renovation in 1971 that nearly quadrupled the square footage of the library, it was dedicated to Frank Melville Jr., Ward Melville's father.

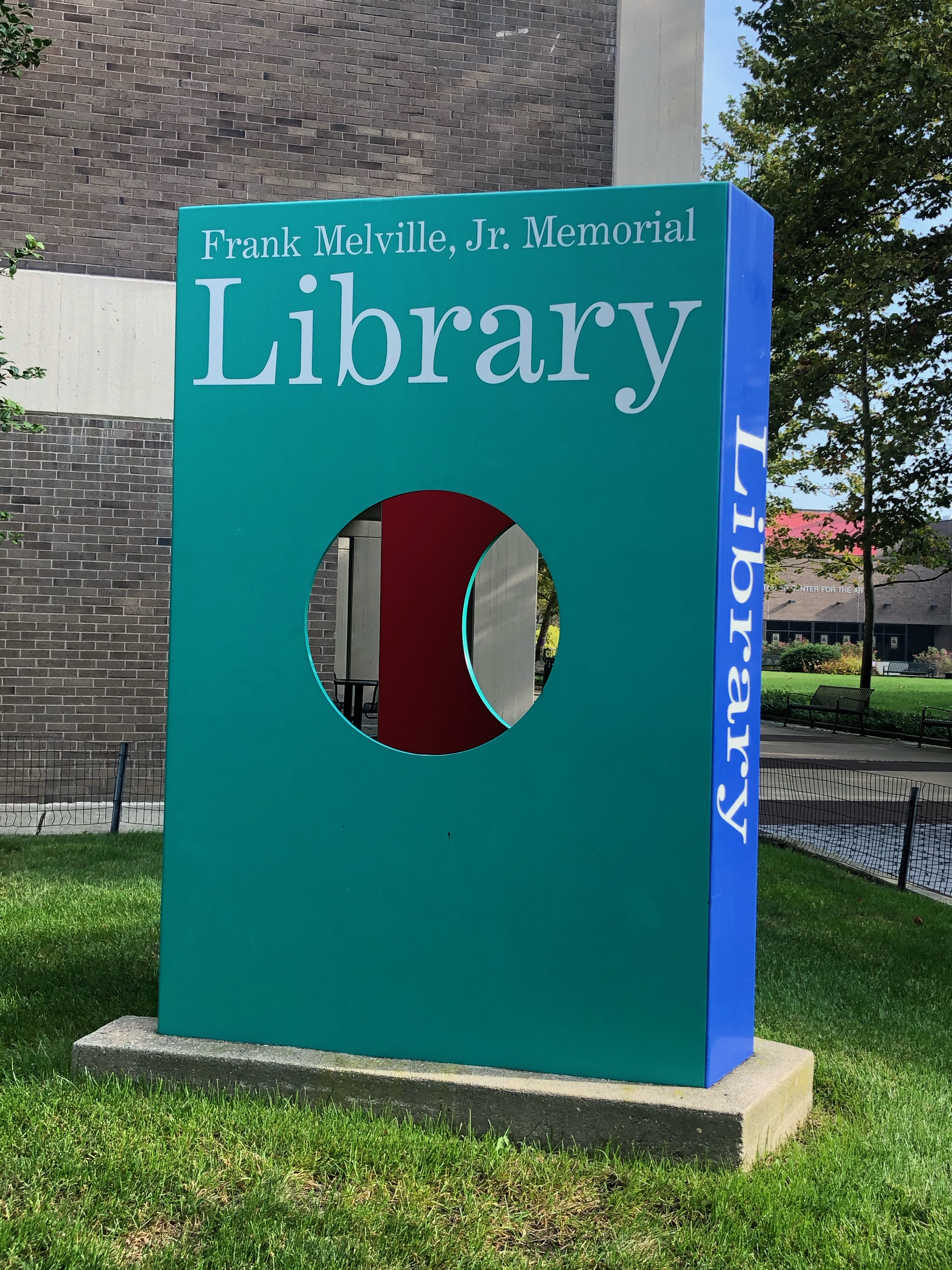
Glaser's structure

In April 2002, a steel sculpture by graphic designer Milton Glaser was installed outside the library facing the Academic Mall.

It holds more than 2.1 million bound volumes and over four million rolls of microfilm. The library is a member of the Association of Research Libraries, a consortium of the top 120 research libraries in the country. The library has a Special Collections Department which houses over 16,000 rare books, 800 antique and hand-drawn maps, and over 150 collections, including the papers of Senator Jacob K. Javits, the Environmental Defense Archive, and the William Butler Yeats Microfilmed Manuscripts Collection.

In 2016 the North and Central Reading Rooms were renovated and modernized with new furniture and technology improvements to become a "knowledge commons." The redesign included adding new independent study areas, more natural light, better acoustics, new flooring, more electrical outlets, and new computer workstations.

== Description ==
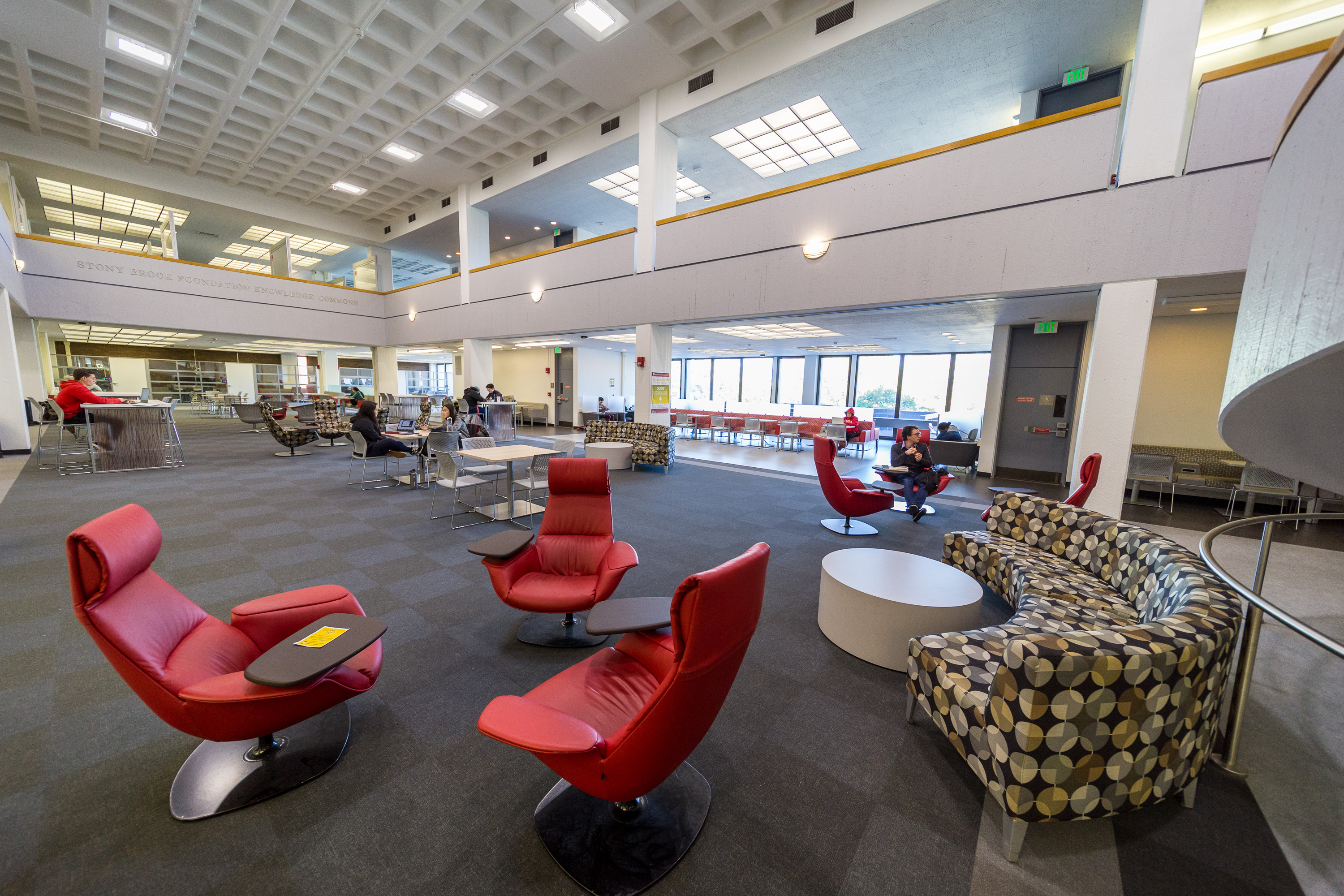
North Reading Room

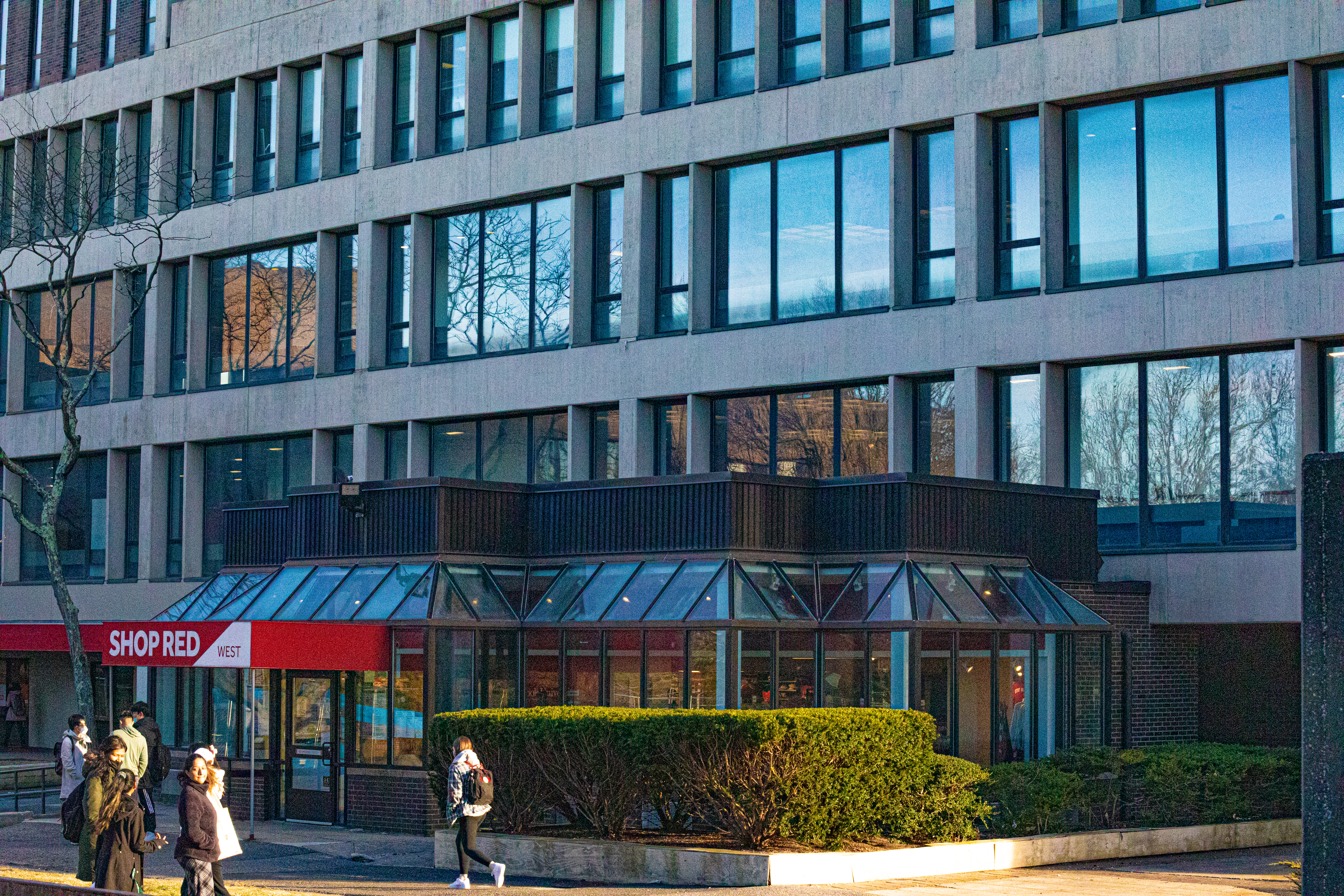
Shop Red West

The building consists of six floors, and a commuter lounge, and is located on the Academic Mall of the university. There are also separate branch libraries in Math, Physics & Astronomy, Chemistry, Music, Computer Science, and Marine Science. The Library also contains offices for different academic departments, as well as classrooms, computer labs, a career center and a bookstore.

Shop Red West, one of the university's bookstores, is located in the basement of the Melville Library. After a longtime partnership with Barnes & Noble, the university reached a contract with Follett Corporation in 2018 to manage its bookstores and electronic catalog. The bookstore, then a Barnes & Noble, moved to the Melville Library from the Stony Brook Union in 1986.

In 2016, Amazon@StonyBrook opened, becoming the first Amazon pick-up location in the state of New York and only the 15th college in the United States to offer an Amazon pick-up location. However, the facility closed in November 2020 after four years. In 2017, a Starbucks coffee shop opened in the basement adjacent to Shop Red West. The 2,842-square foot location cost $1.4 million to make and seats 70. An existent storage facility had to be demolished in order to make room.
