= Shirley Strum Kenny =

American scholar and university president (1934–2026)

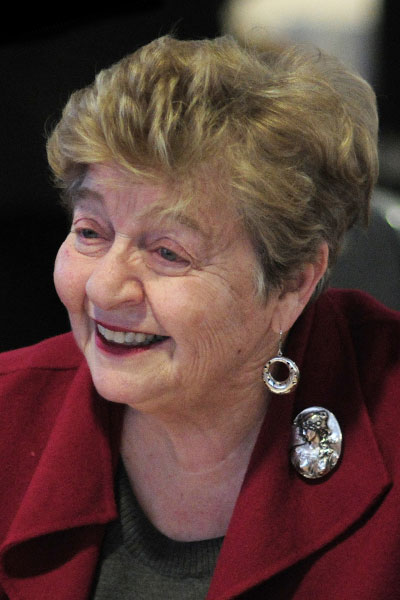
- Kenny in 2019

Interim President of Augusta State University
- In office July 1, 2012 – December 31, 2012
- Preceded by: William A. Bloodworth
- Succeeded by: Position abolished

4th President of Stony Brook University
- In office July 1, 1994 – July 1, 2009
- Preceded by: John Marburger
- Succeeded by: Samuel L. Stanley

7th President of Queens College
- In office July 1, 1985 – July 1, 1994
- Preceded by: Saul B. Cohen
- Succeeded by: Allen Lee Sessoms

Personal details
- Born: August 28, 1934 Tyler, Texas, U.S.
- Died: September 3, 2026 (aged 92)
- Education: University of Texas at Austin (BA); University of Minnesota (MA); University of Chicago (PhD); Chonnam National University (Hon. Ph.D. in Philosophy, 1996)

Academic background
- Thesis: An edition of Sir Richard Steele's The funeral and the tender husband (1964)

Academic work
- Discipline: English literature
- Sub-discipline: Restoration and eighteenth-century British drama
- Institutions: University of Texas; Gallaudet University; The Catholic University of America; University of Maryland

Shirley Strum Kenny (August 28, 1934 – September 3, 2026) was an American scholar of the English language and university president. She was the fourth president of Stony Brook University from 1994 until the end of the 2008–2009 academic year; she was the first woman to hold that position. Kenny served as the president of Queens College from 1985 to 1994 and as the interim president of Augusta State University, upon the retirement of its long time president William A. Bloodworth, from July 1 until the position was eliminated on December 31, 2012, as a result of Augusta State University's merger with Georgia Health Sciences University on August 10 of the same year.

== Life and career ==
Kenny grew up in Tyler, Texas. She held a bachelor's degree in English and journalism from the University of Texas-Austin, an M.A. from the University of Minnesota and a Ph.D. from the University of Chicago. She had taught at the University of Texas, Gallaudet University, The Catholic University of America, and the University of Maryland. At Maryland, she was successively chair of the Department of English and provost of the College of Arts and Humanities.

Kenny died on September 3, 2026, at the age of 92.

Academic offices
Preceded by Saul B. Cohen	President of Queens College; 1985 – 1994	Succeeded by Allen Sessoms
Preceded by John Marburger	President of Stony Brook University; 1994 – 2009	Succeeded by Samuel L. Stanley
Preceded by William A. Bloodworth	Interim President of Augusta State University; July 1, 2012 – December 31, 2012	Position abolished
