= Ervin Y. Galantay =

American architect

- Ervin Y. Galantay
- Born: Ervin Y. Galantay; 14 October 1930; Budapest, Hungary
- Died: 30 October 2011 (aged 81); Zermatt, Switzerland
- Education: ETH Zurich, Zurich
- Occupation: Architect
- Spouse: Karla Jay Noell
- Children: Roy; Richard

Ervin Y. Galantay (born Ervin Iván Galántay; 14 October 1930 – 30 October 2011) was a Hungarian-American architect. He married Karla Jay Noell (New York) in 1959. They had two sons Roy (born in 1961) and Richard (born in 1964). He lived most of his life in Cossonay, Switzerland, where he was a Professor Emeritus at the Ecole Polytechnique Fédérale de Lausanne.

== Career ==
Galantay graduated from the ETH Zürich in 1955 with a diploma in architecture. He continued his studies in the United States, earning a Master of City Design in Philadelphia in 1957.

Galantay’s teaching career began in 1959 as a lecturer at Columbia University in New York. In 1961, he was appointed Assistant Professor at Harvard University, before returning to Columbia University in 1965 to serve as an Associate Professor.

He later joined the École Polytechnique Fédérale de Lausanne (EPFL) as a Professeur Ordinaire (Full Professor). During his tenure at EPFL, Galantay served as the Dean of the Faculty and the Director of the postgraduate programs in Development Planning. He remained at the institution until his retirement in 1995.

=== Military affairs ===
Galantay was a runner with the Vannay Battalion of volunteers in December 1944. He was a Central Captain of the Knightly Order of Hungarian Warriors (Vitéz—valiant in English) and has been decorated with the golden medal of the Hungarian Institute of Military History. He has lectured about urban warfare (Military Operations Urban Terrain – MOUT) at the U. S. Army General Staff School at Fort Leavenworth and numerous other venues: at the British Army's War studies department and at the Conflict Studies Research Centre, Sandhurst and Shrivenham, as well as to Swiss and Hungarian military audiences.

== Distinctions ==
Member of the prize-winning teams in the international competitions for the city Halls of Toronto and Boston. Member of the Design team of the Venezuelan New Town of Ciudad Guayana, and of Owerri, Nigeria. Master Plan of the campus of Stony Brook University Campus: Design of the Library. Humanities Building at Stony Brook L.I., as well, with DPW associates. of the Fine Arts Center and of the Music and Theatre buildings of Stony Brook University.

== Publications ==
articles in
Architecture d'Aujourd'hui 1956.
The Nation (N.Y)
Progressive Architecture
The Town Planning Review
Hungarian Journal of Military History
the Hungarian Quarterly

Books
New Towns from the antiquity to the present Braziller New York, 1975. Seven editions. –
Nuevas ciudades : de la antigüedad a nuestros días Editorial Gustavo Gili: Barcelona and Buenos Aires 1977(also in Japanese and in Persian)
The Metropolis in Transition Paragon House, New York 1980
with A. Saqqaf et al." The Arabic City
New towns worldwide, International Federation for Housing and Planning, The Hague, the Netherlands 1985; editors, E.Y. Galantay, A.K. Constandse, T. Ohba.
Boy soldier, Budapest, 1944 – 1945 Militaria Publishers. 2nd edition 2006. Budapest 280 pages, 70 photos, 11 sketches, ten maps. Foreword by Lt.Gen. D. Petrosky of the US.Army,. See also C. Dick in the British Military Review, and L. Grau in the U.S. Military Review Febr. 2008.

Plays
using the pseudonym Yan A. Galt:
Selina, 1970, Stockwell Ltd UK.
Ivanov/Evanson – a morality play 1971 Stockwell Ltd. UK
