= Stony Brook Film Festival =

American film festival

- Location: Stony Brook, New York, U.S.
- Founded: 1995
- Founded by: Alan Inkles
- Hosted by: Staller Center for the Arts
- Language: English
- Website: www.stonybrookfilmfestival.com

The Stony Brook Film Festival, presented by Island Federal Credit Union and produced by Staller Center for the Arts at Stony Brook University, presents a program of new, independent films every summer since 1995. Features and short films from the U.S. and around the world are screened over ten days at Staller Center, which has been the venue since the beginning. The festival is the brain child of the Staller Center's current director Alan Inkles. The festival continues to gain momentum and has gathered a faithful following, drawing a crowd of over 15,000 people.

== History ==
The annual Stony Brook Film Festival presents ten evenings of features, shorts and documentaries every July at Staller Center for the Arts. Stony Brook seeks fresh and inventive stories, intense character studies, impeccable direction and the highest production values in Independent Cinema. The Stony Brook Film Festival is a sought-after venue for filmmakers, sales agents, and distributors from around the world, who enjoy having their films shown on one of the region's largest screens to audiences of up to 1,000 viewers. The Stony Brook Film Festival is produced by Staller Center for the Arts at Stony Brook University.

The Stony Brook Film Festival has shown numerous New York, East Coast, U.S. and World Premieres from over 78 different countries, and more than 268 of them have been directed by women.

Attendees have included Alan Alda, Eddie Alfano, Thora Birch, Celine Bonnier, Steve Buscemi, Brian Cox, Dana Delany, Stephen Dorff, Matthew Glave, Karoline Herfurth, Sylvia Hoeks, Brent Huff, Rachel Keller, Nathan Lane, Ralph Macchio, Jena Malone, Mary Stuart Masterson, Tim Blake Nelson, Joe Pantoliano, Christopher Plummer, Lewis Pullman, John Putch, Missi Pyle, Eran Riklis, Daphne Rubin-Vega, Campbell Scott, Leelee Sobieski, Meg Steedle, David Strathairn, Tilda Swinton, Christine Vachon, Valerie Weiss, Ray Wise and many others.

The Stony Brook Film Festival offers a variety of ticket options, including individual tickets, weekend passes, flex passes, complete festival passes, premium gold passes, which include premiere seating in the VIP reserved section, promotions at local restaurants, exclusive invitations to opening and closing parties, and more.

The Stony Brook Film Festival was named one of MovieMaker's 25 Coolest Film Festivals in the World, 2026.
