= John Marburger =

American administrator (1941–2011)

Jack Marburger
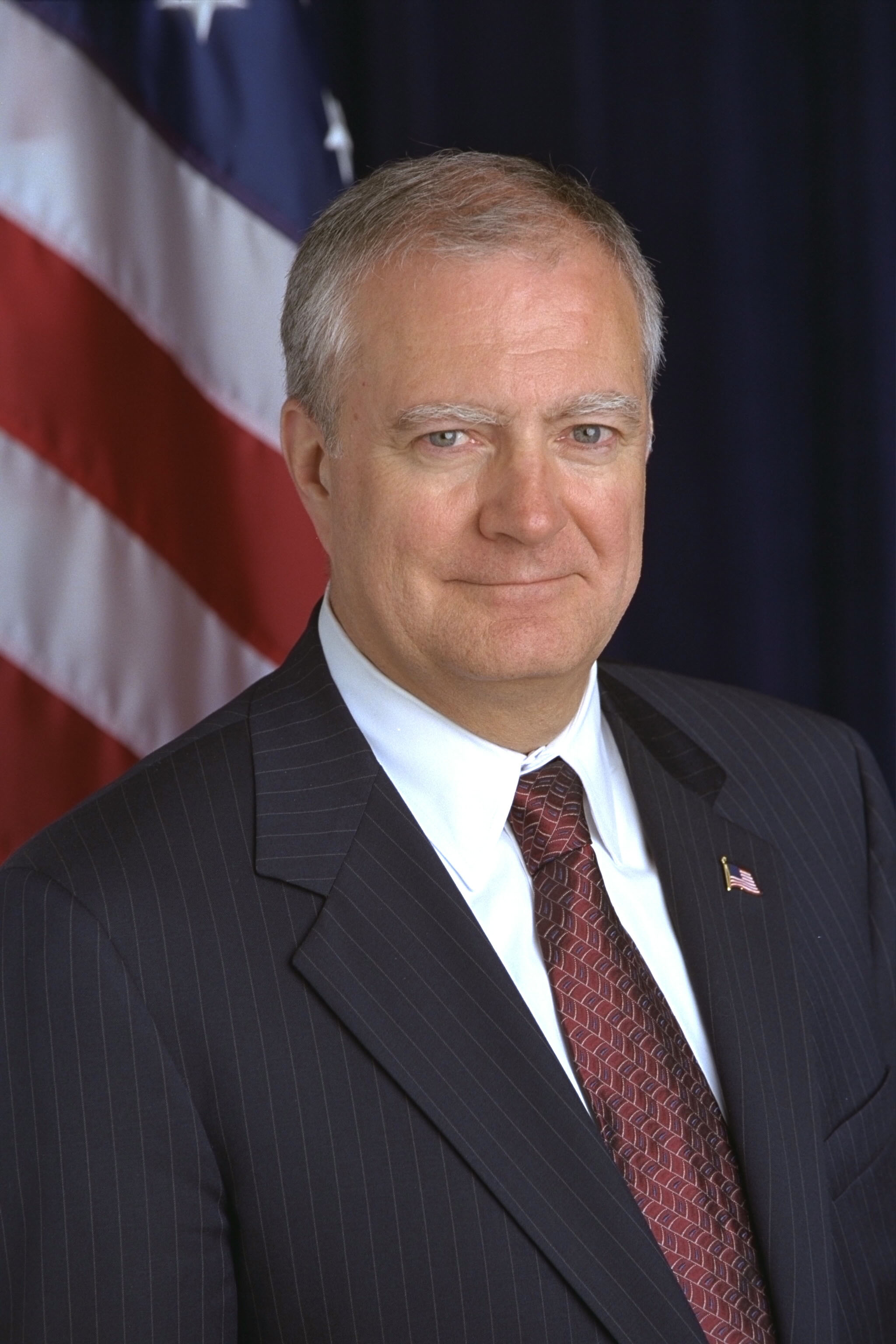

8th Director of the Office of Science and Technology Policy
- In office October 29, 2001 – January 20, 2009
- President: George W. Bush
- Preceded by: Clifford Gabriel (Acting)
- Succeeded by: Ted Wackler (Acting)

3rd President of Stony Brook University
- In office November 4, 1980 – November 7, 1994
- Preceded by: Alexander Pond (Acting)
- Succeeded by: Shirley Strum Kenny

Personal details
- Born: February 8, 1941 New York City, New York, U.S.
- Died: July 28, 2011 (aged 70) Port Jefferson, New York, U.S.
- Party: Democratic
- Education: Princeton University (BS); Stanford University (MS, PhD)
- Scientific career
- Fields: Physics
- Institutions: University of Southern California; Brookhaven National Laboratory
- Thesis: The derivative method in many body theory (1967)

John Harmen "Jack" Marburger III (February 8, 1941 – July 28, 2011) was an American physicist who directed the Office of Science and Technology Policy in the administration of President George W. Bush, serving as the Science Advisor to the President. He has also been credited with keeping the political effects of the September 11 attacks from harming science research—by ensuring that tighter visa controls did not hinder the movement of those engaged in scientific research—and with increasing awareness of the relationship between science and government. He also served as the President of Stony Brook University from 1980 until 1994, and director of Brookhaven National Laboratory from 1998 until 2001.

== Early life ==
Marburger was born in Staten Island, New York, to the former Virginia Smith and John H. Marburger Jr., and grew up in Severna Park, Maryland. He attended Princeton University, graduating in 1962 with a B.A. in physics, followed by a Ph.D. in applied physics from Stanford University in 1967.

After completing his education, he served as a professor of physics and electrical engineering at the University of Southern California beginning in 1966, specializing in the theoretical physics of nonlinear optics and quantum optics, and co-founded the Center for Laser Studies at that institution. He rose to become chairman of the physics department in 1972, and then dean of the College of Letters, Arts and Sciences in 1976. He was engaged as a public speaker on science, including hosting a series of educational television programs on CBS. He was also outspoken on campus issues, and was designated the university's spokesperson during a scandal over preferential treatment of athletes.

== Stony Brook University ==
In 1980, Marburger left USC to become the third president of Stony Brook University in Long Island, New York. At the time, state budget cuts were afflicting the university, and he returned it to growth with increases in the university's science research funding from the federal government.

From 1988 to 1994, Marburger chaired Universities Research Association, the organization that operated Fermilab and oversaw construction of the ill-fated Superconducting Super Collider, an experience that is credited with convincing him of the influence government had in how science is carried out. During this time he also served as a trustee of Princeton University. He stepped down as President of Stony Brook University in 1994, and began doing research again as a member of the faculty.

=== Chair of Shoreham commission ===
In 1983, he was picked by New York Governor Mario Cuomo to chair a scientific fact-finding commission on the Shoreham Nuclear Power Plant, a job that required him to find common ground between the many viewpoints represented on the commission. The commission eventually recommended the closure of the plant, a course he personally disagreed with. Cuomo had formed the commission in mid-May 1983 to provide him with recommendations regarding the plant's safety, the adequacy of emergency plans, and the economics of operating the plant. The commission's consensus recommendations included unanimous findings that no emergency evacuation of the plant could be conducted without the cooperation of Suffolk County, which was refusing to approve an evacuation plan; that the construction of the plant would have been prevented if it had been started after new Nuclear Regulatory Commission regulations were put into effect after the Three Mile Island accident in 1979; and that operating the plant would not reduce utility costs. Marburger himself at the time emphasized that the governor had not been seeking a consensus but rather encouraged multiple viewpoints to be reflected, and characterized the consensus conclusions as not the only important section of the report.

Marburger characterized his participation as a learning experience, and the experience was credited with profoundly changing his view on the relationship between the scientific community and the public. He had never been to a public hearing prior to his participation in the Shoreham commission, and he said that he had initially expected that the issues could be resolved by examining scientific data and establishing failure probabilities. However, he quickly became aware of the importance of the public participation process itself, stating that it was "one of the rare opportunities for the public to feel they were being heard and taken seriously." Marburger's conduct on the committee was praised by activists on both sides of the debate, with his focus on listening to all viewpoints and his ability to not take disagreements personally being especially noted.

== Brookhaven National Laboratory ==
In January 1998, Marburger became president of Brookhaven Science Associates, which subsequently won a bid to operate Brookhaven National Laboratory for the federal government, and he became the director of the lab. He took office after a highly publicized scandal in which tritium leaked from the lab's High Flux Beam Reactor, leading to calls by activists to shut down the lab. Rather than directly oppose the activists, Marburger created policies that improved the environmental management of the lab as well as community involvement and transparency. Marburger also presided over the commissioning of the Relativistic Heavy Ion Collider, expanded the lab's program in medical imaging and neuroscience, and placed more emphasis on its technology transfer program.

The tritium leak, combined with other disclosures about improper handling and disposal of hazardous waste, had caused Secretary of Energy Federico Peña to fire the lab's previous manager, Associated Universities, Inc. Upon starting as the laboratory's director, Marburger noted the increased importance of health and environmental concerns since the beginning of the Cold War, stating that "getting the people at Brookhaven to understand that won't be simple, and there may be some disagreement on how we should do it, but that's my job." Marburger set up a permanent community advisory council and met with local environmental groups to increase communication between them and the laboratory's management. By 2001, when Marburger left to join the Bush administration, local environmental groups credited him with having largely dissipated the distrust that had existed between the groups when he started.

In 2001 he was elected a Fellow of the American Physical Society for "his contributions to laser physics and for his scientific leadership as Director of Brookhaven National Laboratory".

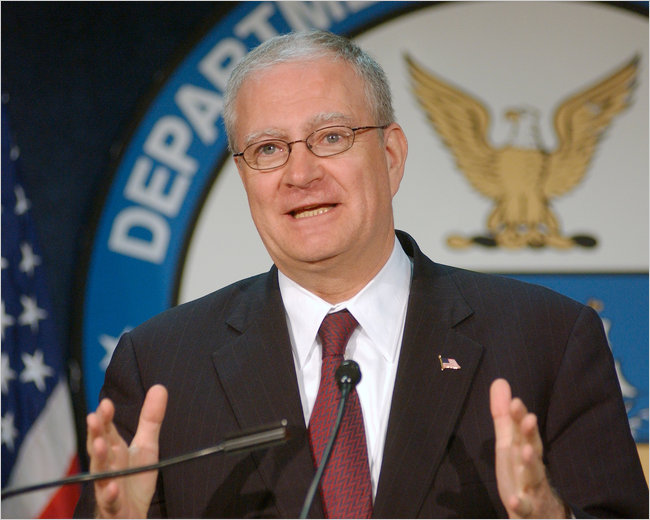
Marburger speaking during a 2003 news conference

== Bush administration ==
In September 2001, Marburger became Director of the Office of Science and Technology Policy under George W. Bush. Marburger was a noted Democrat, a fact that Nature magazine stated was relevant to the decision by the administration to take the unusual step of withholding from Marburger the title of Assistant to the President that previous science advisors had been granted.

His tenure was marked by controversy as he defended the Bush administration from accusations that political influence on science was distorting scientific research in federal agencies and that scientific evidence was being suppressed or ignored in policy decisions, especially on the topics of abstinence-only birth control education, climate change policy, and stem cell research. Marburger defended the Bush Administration from these accusations, saying they were inaccurate or motivated by partisanship, especially on the issue of science funding levels. Marburger continued to be personally respected by many of his academic colleagues.

Marburger's tenure as Director was the longest in the history of that post. After the September 11 attacks, he helped to establish the DHS Directorate for Science and Technology within the new Department of Homeland Security. He has been called a central player opposing new restrictions of international scientific exchanges of people and ideas after the attacks. He later was responsible for reorienting the nation's space policy after the Space Shuttle Columbia disaster, and played an important part in the nation's re-entry into the International Thermonuclear Experimental Reactor program. Marburger was also known for his support of the emerging field of science of science policy, which seeks to analyze how science policy decisions affects a nation's ability to produce and benefit from innovation.

In February 2004, the Union of Concerned Scientists published a report accusing the Bush administration of manipulating science for political purposes, listing more than 20 alleged incidents of censoring scientific results or applying a litmus test in the appointment of supposedly scientific advisory panel members. In April 2004, Marburger published a statement rebutting the report and exposing errors and incomplete explanations in it, and stating that "even when the science is clear—and often it is not—it is but one input into the policy process," but "in this Administration, science strongly informs policy." The Union of Concerned Scientists issued a revised version of their report after Marburger's statement was published. Marburger also called the report's conclusions illusory and the result of focusing on unrelated incidents within a vast government apparatus, and attributed the controversy as being related to the upcoming elections. It was noted that Marburger enjoyed close personal relationships with President Bush, White House Chief of Staff Andrew Card and Office of Management and Budget Director Joshua Bolten, attesting to his active involvement within the administration.

Marburger responded to criticism of his support for Bush administration policies in 2004, stating "No one will know my personal positions on issues as long as I am in this job. I am here to make sure that the science input to policy making is sound and that the executive branch functions properly with respect to its science and technology missions." On the topic of stem cell research, he in 2004 said that stem cells "offer great promise for addressing incurable diseases and afflictions. But I can't tell you when a fertilized egg becomes sacred. That's not my job. That's not a science issue. And so whatever I think about reproductive technology or choice, or whatever, is irrelevant to my job as a science adviser." However, in February 2005, in a speech at the annual conference of the National Association of Science Writers, he stated, "Intelligent design is not a scientific theory.... I don't regard intelligent design as a scientific topic". Also In 2005, he told The New York Times that "global warming exists, and we have to do something about it."

Sherwood Boehlert, the Republican chair of the House Committee on Science during most of Marburger's tenure, said that "the challenge he faced was serving a president who didn't really want much scientific advice, and who let politics dictate the direction of his science policy... and he was in the unenviable position of being someone who had earned the respect of his scientific colleagues while having to be identified with policies that were not science-based." On the other hand, Robert P. Crease, a colleague of Marburger at Stony Brook University, characterized him as someone who "[went] to the White House as a scientist, not an advocate. He refused to weigh in on high-profile, politically controversial issues, but instead set about fixing broken connections in the unwieldy machinery by which the government approves and funds scientific projects.... Some bitterly criticized him for collaborating with the Bush administration. But he left the office running better than when he entered."

== Later life ==
Marburger returned to Stony Brook University as a faculty member in 2009, and co-edited the book The Science of Science Policy: A Handbook, which was published in 2011. He also served as Vice President for Research but stepped down on July 1, 2011. Marburger died Thursday, July 28, 2011, at his home in Port Jefferson, New York, after four years of treatment for non-Hodgkin's lymphoma. He was survived by his wife, two sons, and a grandson. His final publication, a book on quantum physics for laypeople called Constructing Reality: Quantum Theory and Particle Physics, was published shortly after his death.

Academic offices
| Preceded by Alexander Pond; Acting | President of Stony Brook University; 1980–1994 | Succeeded by Shirley Strum Kenny |
Government offices
| Preceded by Clifford Gabriel; Acting | Director of the Office of Science and Technology Policy; 2001–2009 | Succeeded by Ted Wackler; Acting |
