= Sumathi Rao =

Indian theoretical physicist

- Born: 5 December 1956 (age 69)
- Education: IIT Bombay; Stony Brook University; Maharaja Sayajirao University of Baroda
- Spouse: Ashoke Sen
- Awards: Fellow of the National Academy of Sciences; Fellow of the Indian Academy of Sciences
- Scientific career
- Fields: Condensed Matter Physics Quantum Field Theory
- Workplaces: Fermilab; Tata Institute of Fundamental Research; Harish-Chandra Research Institute; Indian Institute of Science Education and Research, Bhopal
- Website: http://www.hri.res.in/~sumathi/

Sumathi Rao (born 5 December 1956) is an Indian theoretical physicist and professor at the International Centre for Theoretical Sciences, Bengaluru, working in the field of condensed matter physics. She is a former member of women in physics promotion of International Union of Pure and Applied Physics (IUPAP) from 2000 to 2008.

== Education ==
Rao earned her Bachelor of Science degree in physics from Maharaja Sayajirao University of Baroda in 1977 and Master of Science degree in physics from Indian Institute of Technology Mumbai with distinction in 1979. She worked on Neutrino Oscillations during her Masters. She received her doctoral degree entitled B-L violation in grand unified theories from Stony Brook University, US under the supervision of Robert Shrock in 1983.

== Research career ==
Rao completed her PhD in high energy physics in the sub-field of grand unified theories. After holding postdoctoral positions at Fermilab and at the University of Wisconsin–Madison, she joined the Institute of Physics, Bhubaneswar in 1987. She made the crucial decision to shift her field of research to theoretical condensed matter physics from high energy physics upon finding that her achievements were being belittled, and her work and papers attributed to her husband Ashoke Sen who was working in the same field. Much of her training in high energy physics and contacts abroad would no longer be useful and she would have to start all over again.

Rao is currently a condensed matter systems Professor at the Harish-Chandra Research Institute (HRI) and has been there since 1995. She has been working in the area of electronic transport in quantum wires, quantum dots and in the field of correlated mesoscopic physics in low dimensions.

She also worked as an associate scientist at International Centre for Theoretical Sciences (ICTS), a centre of the Tata Institute of Fundamental Research and at the Abdus Salam International Centre for Theoretical Physics (ICTP), Trieste. In the year 2020 she has joined Indian Institute of Science Education and Research, Bhopal (IISER Bhopal), Bhopal, Madhya Pradesh, India as a Visiting / Adjunct Professor in the department of Physics.

== Women in science promotion ==
Rao has always been vocal about the detrimental biases faced by women academic scholars. Rao's scientific contributions were undervalued with innuendos that her husband, also a famous scientist in the same field, wrote her papers for her. She has involved in the International Union of Pure and Applied Physics (IUPAP) working group women in physics which has been working to increase the representation of women in physics, particularly at higher and decisionmaking levels of from its inception in 2000 until 2008.

She wrote articles focusing on the topic of getting girls interested in a career in science or engineering and interested in reaching the top of their profession, the hurdles they will have to face, and the ways to improve their chances of making it to the top of respective fields.

== Fellowships and awards ==
Rao has been awarded as Fellow of National Academy of Sciences, India in 2001 and Fellow of the Indian Academy of Sciences in 2017 for her contributions in the theoretical condensed matter physics. She was named a Fellow of the American Physical Society in 2022 "for contributions to transport in low-dimensional interacting systems, especially junctions of more than two wires, edge/surface physics of topological systems, and for contributions to overcoming the under-representation of women in physics".
