= Marci Lobel =

Health psychologist

- Occupation: Professor of Psychology
- Awards: APS Lifetime Achievement (Mentor) Award (2026); Fulbright U.S. Distinguished Scholar Award (2025); APA Distinguished Leadership Award (2016); APA Distinguished Mentoring Award (2008)

Academic background
- Education: Harvard University, University of California Los Angeles

Academic work
- Institutions: Stony Brook University

Marci Lobel is an American health psychologist and Distinguished Professor at Stony Brook University. Her research has examined how stress, coping, and social support affect mental and physical health, including in people facing chronic illness, and she is particularly known for her work on women's reproductive health, the effects of prenatal stress on pregnancy and newborn health, and how mothers learn to cope with stress.

== Biography ==
Lobel completed her undergraduate A.B. degree at Harvard University (1982) in Psychology and Social Relations with highest honors—summa cum laude. She had attended university with the idea that she would become a pediatrician, but upon exposure to psychological science, she decided to follow a research path. Lobel subsequently completed her Ph.D. in Social Psychology with minors in Measurement and Health Psychology at the University of California, Los Angeles (1989). Christine Dunkel-Schetter was her mentor at UCLA. Together, they conducted health psychology studies on social support during pregnancy and postpartum depression, prenatal maternal stress and preterm birth, and psychological reactions to infertility. While a doctoral student, Lobel also worked with Shelley E. Taylor at UCLA on classical social psychology research about social comparison.

After completing her doctorate, Lobel remained briefly at UCLA working with Tara Scanlan in Sport Psychology. She contributed to the development/testing of the Sport Commitment Model—why young athletes continue participating in sports, with factors including enjoyment, personal investment, social constraints, alternatives, and opportunities.

In 1990, Lobel joined the psychology faculty of the State University of New York at Stony Brook (now Stony Brook University, SBU) as an assistant professor. At Stony Brook, she established the Stress and Reproduction (STAR) Laboratory, which studies stress, coping, and health, particularly in pregnancy, infertility, and childbirth. In addition to a wide variety of administrative roles at the University, for the Psychology Department she served as Director of Undergraduate Studies from 2001–2004 and Director of the Graduate Program in Social and Health Psychology from 2007–2018. Lobel was promoted in 2024 by the State University of New York Board of Trustees to the rank of Distinguished Teaching Professor, SUNY's highest academic rank.

The Fulbright Program is the U.S. government's flagship international academic exchange program, supporting scholars, students, and professionals in research, teaching, and international collaboration. As a Fulbright Distinguished Scholar in 2026, Lobel resided at Masaryk University in Brno, Czech Republic. At "MUNI" Faculty of Medicine, she taught her course on the Psychology of Women's Health and initiated a research program on prenatal stress and the experiences of pregnant Czech women.

== Awards ==
Lobel was awarded the American Psychological Association (APA) Bonnie R. Strickland and Jessica Henderson Daniel Distinguished Mentoring Award in 2008, the APA Committee on Women in Psychology Leadership Award in 2016, and the Excellence in Health Psychology Mentoring Award from the Society for Health Psychology in 2021. Her 2016 APA award citation noted her "distinguished and vital contributions to social psychological theory, to understanding stress, and to a theory of gendered racism."

She was a recipient of Stony Brook University's Dean's Award for Excellence in Graduate Mentoring by a Faculty Member (2011) and the Department of Psychology Teacher of the Year Award (2010-2011).

== Research ==
Lobel's research focuses on women's reproductive health and how emotions, behaviors, and physical conditions affect pregnancy and birth outcomes. She has made contributions to research on racial disparities in birth outcomes, and outcomes of assisted reproductive technology.

Lobel is the Senior Researcher and Director of the Stress and Reproduction (STAR) Lab, where her colleagues and graduate students are studying stress related to the COVID-19 pandemic and its effects on pregnant women and their babies. The COVID-19 Pregnancy Experiences (COPE) study aims to brings insight into how pregnant women used coping strategies during the pandemic. The STAR lab is also conducting research to improve identification of risk factors that may affect treatment and treatment outcomes among pregnant women, including those with opioid use disorder.

== Representative publications ==
- Lobel, M. (1994). Conceptualizations, measurement, and effects of prenatal maternal stress on birth outcomes. Journal of Behavioral Medicine, 17(3), 225–272.
- Lobel, M., Cannella, D. L., Graham, J. E., DeVincent, C., Schneider, J., & Meyer, B. A. (2008). Pregnancy-specific stress, prenatal health behaviors, and birth outcomes. Health Psychology, 27(5), 604–615.
- Lobel, M. & DeLuca, R. S. (2007). Psychosocial sequelae of cesarean delivery: review and analysis of their causes and implications. Social Science & Medicine, 64(11), 2272–2284.
- Lobel, M., DeVincent, C. J., Kaminer, A., & Meyer, B. A. (2000). The impact of prenatal maternal stress and optimistic disposition on birth outcomes in medically high-risk women. Health Psychology, 19(6), 544–553.
- Lobel, M., Dunkel-Schetter, C., & Scrimshaw, S. C. (1992). Prenatal maternal stress and prematurity: a prospective study of socioeconomically disadvantaged women. Health Psychology, 11(1), 32–40.
- Taylor, S.E. & Lobel, M. (1989). Social comparison activity under threat: Downward evaluation and upward contacts. Psychological Review, 96 (4): 569–575.
