= Mel Pekarsky =

American artist and art educator (born 1934)

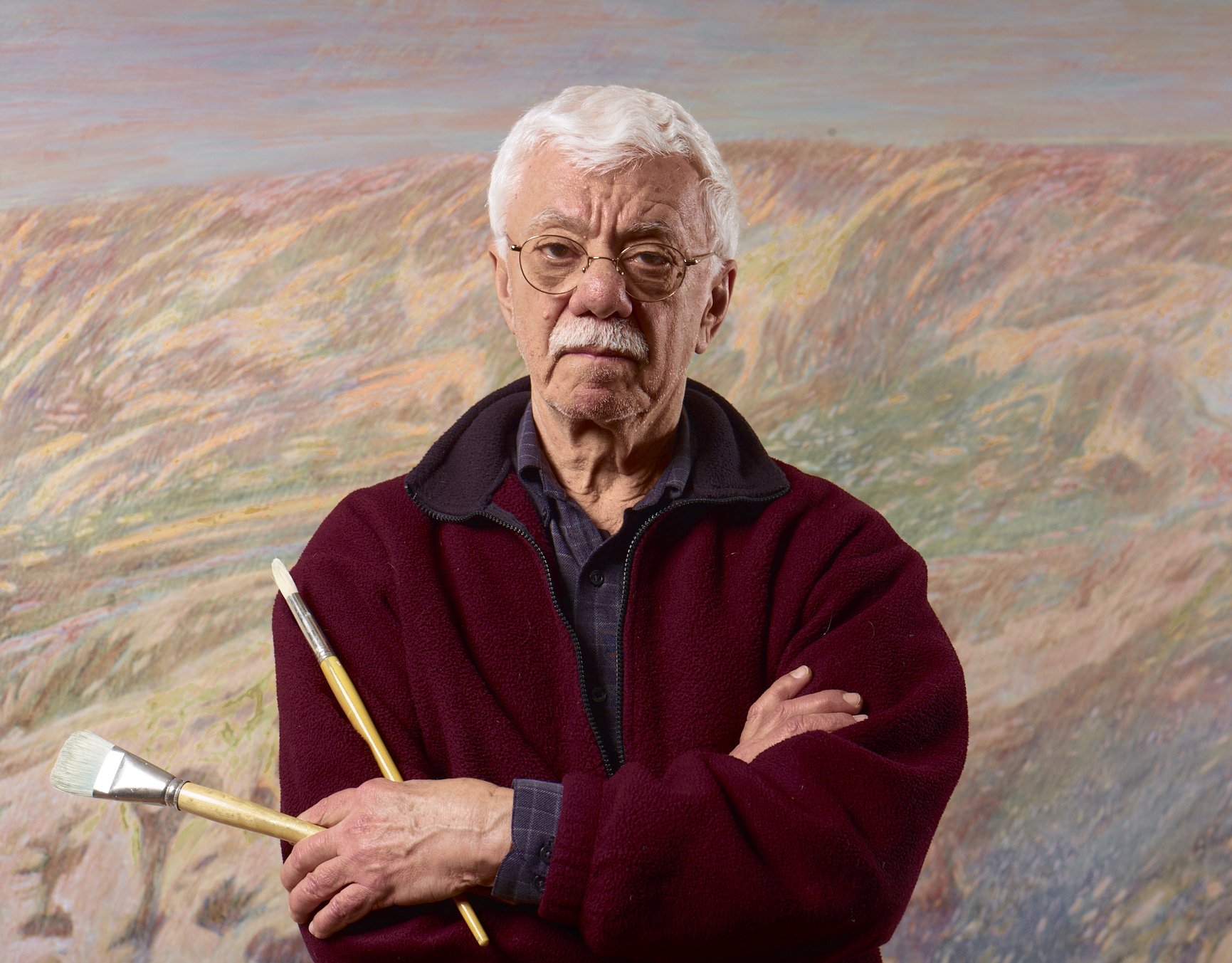
- Mel Pekarsky in his studio, February 2013
- Born: Melvin Hirsch Pekarsky; September 18, 1934; Chicago, Illinois
- Died: October 12, 2025 (aged 91)
- Known for: Painting

Mel (Melvin H.) Pekarsky (born September 18, 1934 in Chicago, Illinois) is an American artist and art educator. He is best known for his paintings and drawings of the desert, and is recognized by art critic Donald Kuspit as "one of the most significant contemporary landscape artists." A professor of art at the State University of New York at Stony Brook for forty years, Pekarsky's work has been shown by the Whitney Museum of American Art, The Fogg Museum of Art at Harvard University, the Cleveland Museum of Art, and the Butler Institute of American Art, among many other venues.

== Education and early years ==
The son of Inda Levin and Abe Pekarsky, who owned a haberdashery, he attended public school in Gary, Indiana. While in high school, he studied weekends at the Saturday School of the Art Institute of Chicago, where he began his undergraduate studies in 1951, transferring the following year to Northwestern University, where he received his B.A. in Studio Art in 1955. He completed his M.A. in Art History there in 1956, writing his thesis on The Drawings of Jean-Francois Millet, while teaching studio art at Northwestern's Chicago campus.

Pekarsky moved to New York City in 1956, joining the staff of the Solomon R. Guggenheim Museum, then under the directorship of James Johnson Sweeney. He also began PhD studies at New York University's Institute of Fine Arts in the fall of 1956, but was soon called up to military service, serving in the US Army Combat Engineers. During this period he spent time training in Texas mesa country, his "first face-to-face meeting with the southwest desert."

== Academic career ==
Returning to Chicago after military service, he was asked to start the Art Department at Kendall College in Evanston, IL. During this period (1960–1967), Pekarsky showed with the Devorah Sheman and John L. Hunt Galleries, with "Artists of Chicago and Vicinity" at the Art Institute of Chicago, among other venues, and in Exhibition Momentum, from which work was selected by the US Information Agency to travel in an exhibition of American art in France and Germany. During this period he also worked as an illustrator, and produced a number of children's books (The Curious Cow, The Little Red Hen, and others) before returning to New York in the fall of 1967, accepting an appointment as assistant dean at the School of Visual Arts. After serving there as assistant and then associate dean, Pekarsky spent the 1970–71 academic year as visiting graduate faculty at New York University, moving in 1973 to a visiting artist position at the State University of New York at Stony Brook.

He was appointed associate professor in 1974, and in 1976 became studio programs coordinator (in which position he would remain until 2004), re-writing the department's B.A. in Studio Art. Promoted to Professor in 1984, he began a five-year tenure as chair of the Department of Art, writing and implementing the MFA program in Studio Art, which he directed from 1989 until 2003. Also in that year, Pekarsky chaired a College Art Association panel on "The Idea of the Moral Imperative in Contemporary Art," discussed in Judith Seigel's Mutiny and the Mainstream: Talk That Changed Art, 1975–1990. A transcript of this panel was published in Art Criticism in 1991. A second term as chair of the Department followed from 2005 to 2007, shortly preceding his retirement in 2009. Pekarsky continued to teach in the MFA Program as professor emeritus and visiting professor until 2014.

== Artistic style and development ==
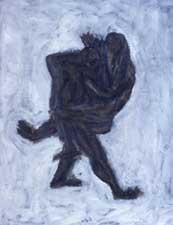
Jacob Wrestles the Angel, oil, 12" x 16", 1959. Private Collection, NY

=== Early years ===
Initially influenced by the Chicago figurative style, Pekarsky would transition from this "to the figure in landscape, to groups of figures in the landscape. The figure would later grow smaller and finally withdraw from the stage altogether, with the exception of the implicit presence of the viewer."

=== New York and public art ===
After moving back to New York in 1967, Pekarsky became involved with public art, specifically City Walls, Inc., an artist-directed nonprofit which he helped found in 1969. Pekarsky painted five large-scale, public murals for City Walls between 1969 and 1974. The City Walls project would eventually evolve into New York's Public Art Fund.

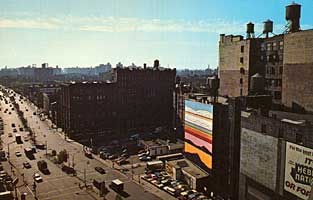
Houston and Crosby Streets, New York, a project of City Walls, Inc., through grants from the National Endowment for the Arts and the Bernhard Foundation. 1972. Destroyed.

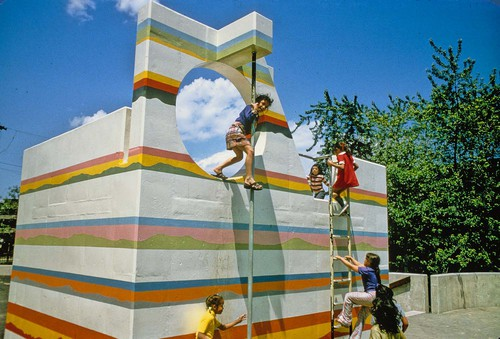
Doyle Park, Yonkers, NY, with Abel and Bainnson landscape artists, through a grant from the US Department of Health Education and Welfare. 1974. Destroyed.

In addition to the visibility that City Walls brought to his work, its scale, according to Gil Einstein – Director of G.W. Einstein Co., Inc., and his art dealer for almost thirty years – also "forced him to simplify his imagery," after which "his paintings and drawings of formal gardens and landscapes became increasingly stylized."

While he was working on the public murals, these formal gardens – empty of humans though shaped by them – were being painted in the studio, and the artist's ideas about both the urban environment and our relationships to the earth were changing.

It was during this period that he became involved with environmental organizations and designed posters for the first Earth Day (April 22, 1970).

=== The Desert ===
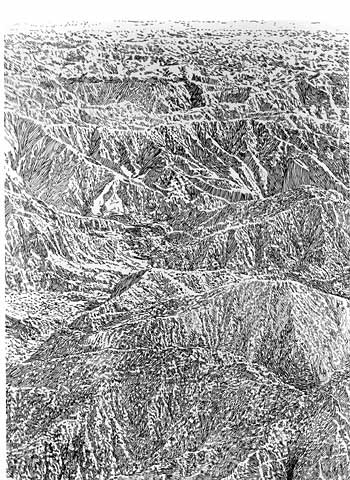
Anxious Object, pen and ink on paper, 40" X 30", 1988, collection Snite Museum of Art, Notre Dame University, Notre Dame, Indiana.

By the mid-1970s, figures had already "walked off the picture plane ... left behind in the move" from Chicago back to New York. In 1975 a "catalyst for more change" occurred in the form of a trip to the Mojave Desert, causing him to turn from the crafting of public, abstract "landscape symbols" to the "quiet private making" of what he termed "environmentally political" pieces. Pekarsky's work then became more explicitly "engaged in a moral imperative which – like it or not, I suppose – as artists today we're all engaged in."

Rather than containing human subjects, Pekarsky's paintings increasingly treat the viewer as the subject, and the canvas as a lens onto both a physical and psychic landscape. As Donald Kuspit put it, "Pekarsky's desert landscapes are interior as well as exterior landscapes, subjective and objective at the same time, which is why they seem uncannily real rather than materially real."

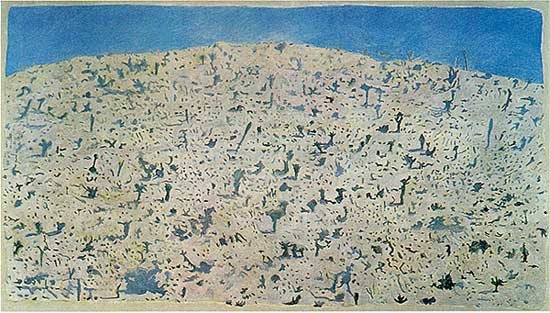
Ghosts, mixed media on unstretched canvas, 96" x 162", 1989

In 1989, Pekarsky was invited to participate in "Painting Beyond the Death of Painting," the first group exhibition of contemporary American painting in the Soviet Union Since 1917, in which he showed recent large-scale work from this period.

The early 1990s saw a noticeable change in Pekarsky's style. Gil Einstein noted in 1995 that "the fine detail of the work of the 1980's has disappeared and been replaced by an expressionism which partially reflects the artist's earlier work. Where methodology was the invention before, imagery is the invention now. Having shown us for many years what he saw, Pekarsky is now beginning to show us what he thinks."

Pekarsky's work throughout the 1990s and 2000s continued this trend. Reviewing a 2009 retrospective of his work, Benjamin Genocchio wrote in The New York Times:

The secret of the success of these little sketches is that the artist does not so much seek to record exactly what he sees, like a camera, as to translate an overall vision and experience of the landscape. He makes do with little more than intimations of scenery, using streaks, flecks and blobs of paint to suggest vegetation, rocks and the contours of the land.

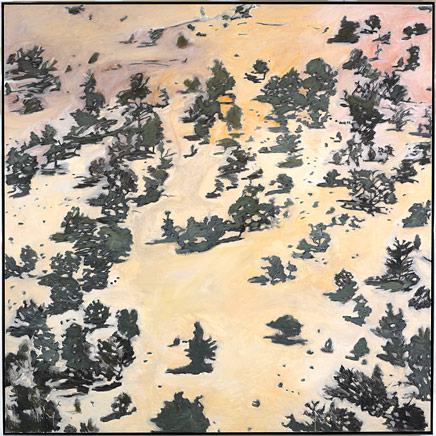
In Canyon de Chelly, oil/canvas, 60" x 60", 1996

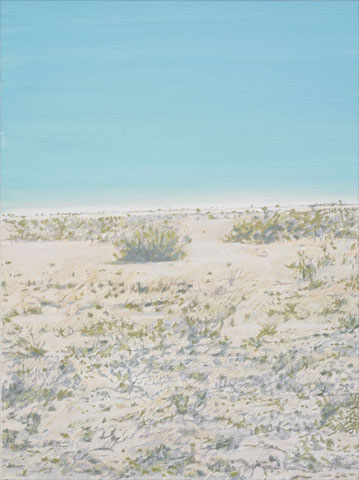
Strange Light, oil & pencil/canvas, 16" x 12", 2008, Private Collection, New York

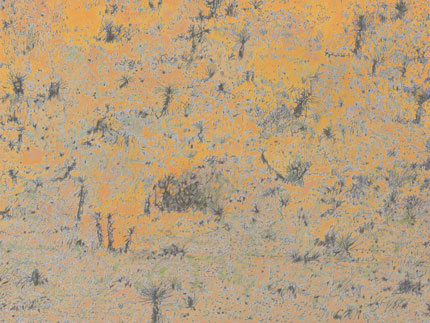
Burnt, oil & pencil/canvas, 12" x 16", 2013, Private Collection, New York

In a statement for the opening of an installation of his work in 2013, Pekarsky wrote:

I've been painting for over sixty years.

The earth, my work and I have been discussing our anxiety for well over 40 years.

The discussion keeps getting more complicated.

It didn't start out that way. At first the desert was for me an epiphany, the confluence of form and meaning, abstraction and representation; it stands in as an icon for all land.

I go there and walk and ride and climb in it and sometimes fly over it, and talk to and drink and eat with the people who live in it, and read and think about it. I've come to see the water wars, the ethnic wars, the racial wars, the economic wars, the political wars, the war; I look at it and watch the land watching us, and try to bring that back with me and show the earth's quiet waiting.

Pekarsky continues to paint, curate, and teach in the MFA program as emeritus and visiting professor at Stony Brook University.

== Exhibitions and collections ==
=== Selected one-man exhibitions ===
- 2017: Small Things, Quiet Places, Gallery North – Setauket, NY (Oct 7 - Nov 3)
- 2013: Installation at Simons Center for Geometry and Physics, Stony Brook University – Stony Brook, NY
- 2009: Endgame, at two venues: Anthony Giodano Gallery, Dowling College (Oakdale, NY) and Gallery North (Setauket, NY)
- 2009: Mel Pekarsky: Things In The Desert, Paintings, Drawings and Artist's Books, 1974–2009, University Art Gallery, Stony Brook University – Stony Brook, NY
- 2007: Etudes: Paintings, Prints, Drawings, Van Deb Editions – New York, NY
- 2002–03: Coming to the Desert, The Nielsen Gallery – Boston, MA
- 2001: Anxious Object: Paintings and Drawings from Two Decades by Mel Pekarsky, Nevada Museum of Art – Reno, NV
- 1977–1997: Eleven one-man exhibitions at G.W. Einstein Co. – New York, NY
- 1993: Intimate Spaces, The Museums at Stony Brook – Stony Brook, NY
- 1990: Mel Pekarsky, Butler Institute of American Art – Youngstown, Ohio
- 1987: Marianne Deson Gallery – Chicago, IL
- 1984: Mel Pekarsky, Miami-Dade Community College – Miami, FL
- 1982: The Fine Arts Gallery, The Bank of America Headquarters Building – San Francisco, CA
- 1980: 112 Greene Street Gallery – New York, NY
- 1980: Centro Colombo-Americano – Bogota, Colombia
- 1974: Gimpel & Weitzenhoffer Gallery – New York, NY
- 1966: The Devorah Sherman Gallery – Chicago, IL
- 1963, '65: The John L. Hunt Gallery – Chicago, IL
- 1961: The University of Chicago – Chicago, IL

=== Selected group exhibitions ===
- 2014: Summer Salon, Van Deb Editions – Long Island City, NY
- 2014: Identity of Place, installation, Omni Center – Uniondale, NY
- 2014: Impressions, Gallery North – Setauket, NY
- 2013: Elementary with Nobuho Nagasawa and, Howardena Pindell, Gallery North – Setauket, NY
- 2013: Black + White, print editions with Chris Gianakos, Mimi Gross, Paul Resika, Arden Scott, Claire Seidl, and others, Van Deb Editions – New York, NY
- 2008: 183rd Annual Invitational Exhibition, National Academy of Design – New York, NY
- 2008: From Here to the Horizon: American Landscape Prints from Whistler to Celmins, Zimmerli Museum, Rutgers University – Rutgers, NJ
- 2006: Under Cover: Artists' Sketchbooks, The Fogg Museum of Art, Harvard University – Cambridge, MA
- 2005: Trees, From Here to Eternity (Hopefully), Nielsen Gallery – Boston, MA
- 2003: Prints, Albright Knox Gallery – Buffalo, NY
- 2002: Grounded, landscape painting, Rosenberg + Kaufman Fine Art – New York, NY
- 2001: American Academy of Arts and Letters Invitational Exhibition – New York, NY
- 2000: A Decade of Collecting: Recent Acquisitions of Prints and Drawings from 1940–2000, The Fogg Museum of Art, Harvard University – Cambridge, MA
- 1999: Art Santa Fe, small paintings
- 1978–1994: 18 group exhibitions at G.W. Einstein Co. – New York, NY
- 1993: The Environmentalists; The Pleasures and Perils of Our Landscape, with Rackstraw Downes, Kay WalkingStick and others, Gallery North – Setauket, NY (also curator)
- 1991: Drawings, an exhibition of drawings by artists residing on Long Island, including works by Malcolm Morley, Leon Polk Smith, Larry Rivers, Alan Shields, others, Gallery North – Setauket, NY
- 1990: Landscapes on Paper, Graham Modern Gallery – New York, NY
- 1990: 165th Annual Exhibition, National Academy of Design – New York, NY
- 1989: Painting Beyond the Death of Painting, First Group Exhibition of American Art in the Soviet Union Since 1917, Kuznetsky Most Exhibition Hall – Moscow
- 1989: Transformative Vision: Contemporary American Landscape Painting, Three Rivers Arts Festival, The Carnegie Museum of Art – Pittsburgh, PA
- 1987: Monumental Space Variations, curated by Donald Kuspit, One Penn Plaza – New York, NY
- 1984: An Overview of American Drawing: The Last Twenty Years, Cleveland Museum of Art – Cleveland, OH
- 1983: NY Group Exhibition, Albright-Knox Gallery of Art – Buffalo, NY
- 1982: Ten Years of Public Art, inaugural exhibition, The Doris C. Freedman Gallery of Public Art, The Urban Center – New York, NY
- 1981: The American Landscape: Recent Developments, The Whitney Museum of American Art – Stamford, CT branch
- 1980–81: Views Over America, traveling exhibition, The Museum of Modern Art Junior Council
- 1979: Works of Art in Public Places, The Cooper-Hewitt Museum of the Smithsonian Institution, Federal Hall of the Department of The Interior – New York, NY
- 1978: Contemporary Drawings: Seven Artists, The Cleveland Museum of Art – Cleveland, OH
- 1978: Mural Art, USA, Musees Royeaux des Beaux-Arts de Belgique – Brussels, Belgium
- 1978: Fine Art Lithography From Solo Press, Nobe Gallery – New York, NY
- 1974: American Prints, The Brooklyn Museum – Brooklyn, NY
- 1973: American Landscape Painting, Gimpel & Weitzenhoffer Gallery – New York, NY
- 1972: Projects of City Walls, Lever House – New York, NY
- 1971: Oversize Prints, billboard on 23rd Street, The Whitney Museum of American Art – New York, NY

Also:

- Art Institute of Chicago – Chicago, IL
- With the United States Information Agency – France and Germany, various cities
- Exhibition Momentum – Chicago, IL
- The Richard Gray Gallery – Chicago, IL
- The University of Illinois – Chicago, IL
- The Werbe Gallery – Detroit, MI
- The Blue Parrot Gallery – New York, NY

=== Selected public and corporate collections ===
- The Snite Museum of Art, Notre Dame University
- The Museums at Ball State University
- The Cleveland Museum of Art
- The Fogg Museum of Art, Harvard University
- The Nevada Museum of Art
- The Corcoran Gallery of Art
- United States Department of State
- The Columbus, Ohio Museum of Art
- The Minneapolis Institute of The Arts
- The Yale University Museums
- Leigh and Mary Block Gallery, Northwestern University
- Simons Center for Geometry and Physics, Stony Brook University
- The Indianapolis Museum of Art
- The Weatherspoon Museum of Art, The University of North Carolina at Greensborough
- The University of North Dakota
- Marymount College
- Kendall College
- The Environmental Protection Agency
- Zimmerli Museum, Print Archives, Rutgers University
- Roswell, NM Museum of Art and Study Center
- The Amerada Hess Corporation
- American Express
- American Electric Power Corporation
- American Medical Association
- AT&T Corporation
- The Bank of America
- The Chase Manhattan Bank
- Fidelity Investments
- The General Mills Corporation
- The Heublein Corporation
- The Prudential Corporation of America
- Renaissance Technology
- The Standard Oil Corporation
- The Westinghouse Corporation
