= John Francis Lee =

American academic administrator

- Born: John Francis Lee; September 19, 1918; Boston, Massachusetts
- Died: December 2, 1999 (aged 81); San Bernardino, California

John Francis Lee (September 19, 1918 – December 2, 1999) was the first president of Stony Brook University who served January 1, 1961 to November 9, 1961. He also served as the chairmen of the Mechanical Engineering Department at North Carolina State University and as president of International Development Services Inc. for 10 years.

John Lee was first scouted by Stony Brook University back in 1960 under Dean Leonard K. Olsen, who was the Dean of the new college in State University of New York system. At the time John Francis Lee was the Chairman of the Department of Mechanical Engineering at North Carolina State Engineering in Raleigh and originally only supposed to be a candidate for the position of Dean of Engineering. However, after brief reconsideration John Francis Lee took up the position of President of Stony Brook University in January 1961. President Lee's first address expressed that "... a university has two equally important and inseparable responsibilities, namely teaching and research;" and that "...teaching which is not sustained by research to gain new understanding and insight into the nature of man and the natural world is bound to be sterile."

On June 4, 1961, the college's first Commencement ceremony was held. President John Lee presided and Dean Olsen awarded the degrees. Immediately following the first commencement, President Lee proceeded with his plans for reorganization, calling for a college of arts and science to go along with the already established College of Engineering, as well as a graduate school. However, with these ambitious changes came push back. Tensions from the faculty and the student body arose when President Lee made clear his intention to replace dean of students, Allen Austill, who was the last remaining administrator from Olsen's administration. A student strike in support of Austill caused President Lee to address the crowd, but it was not successful. A petition bearing 400 student signatures was sent to higher administration, triggering the end of John Francis Lee's presidency at Stony Brook University.

== Early life ==
John Francis Lee was born to a family of Irish Immigrants on September 19, 1918, in Boston, Massachusetts. His father Michael Francis Lee was 23 and his mother Catherine Marie Arrigal was 24 at the time of his birth. He had three brothers and three sisters, most of them being half siblings besides his younger brother Michael Peter Lee. He lived in Boston for almost all of his childhood and adolescence. John Francis Lee enlisted in the army on November 5, 1942, and was discharged on November 21, 1945.

== Later life ==
John Francis Lee went to Washington to work for the National Science Foundation for a brief period after his presidency at Stony Brook University. He then went on to be appointed Executive Vice President of International Development Services Inc. IDS was a nonprofit organization tax exempted by the U.S. Treasury department founded by Robert Watts "Pete" Hudgens in 1953. This company was started after Hudgens worked with Nelson Rockefeller and was inspired to make his own being IDS. Within two years, John Francis Lee became president of IDS and he held it for ten years.

John Francis Lee was mentioned in the hearings of the state department security congressional subcommittee to investigate the administration of internal security. Lee also had a statement in the US Congressional Committee on Agriculture in 1966. He wanted to fight a world war against hunger, claiming to have witnessed famines in India. He also brings up many other underdeveloped countries and why they need assistance.
