= Richard Clark (dermatologist) =

American dermatologist and biomedical engineer

Richard A.F. Clark is a dermatologist and biomedical engineer currently at the State University of New York at Stony Brook in Stony Brook, New York. Clark co-edited, with Peter M. Henson, of The Molecular and Cellular Biology of Wound Repair (Plenum Press, 1988) and is a contributor to wound repair, dermatology, and angiogenesis research. In addition, he is also a member of the board of directors of the Society for Investigative Dermatology.

== Education ==
Clark graduated from the Massachusetts Institute of Technology and has worked at the Massachusetts General Hospital.

== Career ==
He was previously professor at Harvard University. He is now a professor at State University of New York at Stony Brook.

He has published over 300 research papers and has over 26,000 citations per ResearchGate.net.
