= Jean McGarry =

- Born: June 18, 1948 (age 78); Providence, Rhode Island, United States
- Education: Harvard University, A.B., Johns Hopkins University, M.A.
- Occupations: novelist, short-story writer Professor and Co-Chair of The Writing Seminars, Johns Hopkins University
- Writing career
- Notable works: Ocean State; A Bad and Stupid Girl; Dream Date; Gallagher’s Travels
- Notable awards: fellow at Civitella Ranieri

Jean McGarry is an author of fiction and a professor at the Johns Hopkins Writing Seminars.

== Early life and education ==
Jean McGarry was born in Providence, Rhode Island, was educated at Regis and Radcliffe Colleges, the University of California-Irvine and Johns Hopkins University, where she received an M.A. in The Writing Seminars in 1983.

== Career ==
McGarry has worked as a newspaper reporter and translator, but mostly has taught writing, first at the University of Missouri-Columbia, then at George Washington University, before coming to Hopkins to join The Writing Seminars faculty in 1987. She chaired the department for eight years and is presently co-chair.

Her first book, Airs of Providence, was a collection of stories, interwoven with the chapters of a novella. Published in 1985, it won the Southern Review prize for short fiction. The Very Rich Hours, which came out two years later, was another such blend: a novella about life at Harvard in the early 1970s, arranged around a set of prose poems. By the third book, The Courage of Girls, a novel set in New York, all such experimentation had (at least temporarily) ceased. In 1994, Home at Last, a collection of stories, was published in 1994 and reverted to scenes from the streets of Providence, ranging in time from 1938 to the then present. Three years later, another novel, Gallagher’s Travels, was published: this book tells the story of an ambitious reporter on the make in the world of daily newspapers. A chapter from Airs of Providence was excerpted in Cabbage and Bones, an anthology of Irish American Women’s Fiction, 1997. Dream Date, 2001, marked the point at which experimentation reappeared. This book was followed by Ocean State, another collection of stories. In the works, Spin Cycle, a novel, Blue Boy, a novella, and Tinytown, a story collection.

Individual stories have been published in The Yale Review, Little Star, Boulevard, Southern Review, The Southwest Review, North American Review, Chicago Review, The New Yorker, Antioch Review, Stand, Sulfur and other journals.

An academic associate at the Baltimore-Washington Psychoanalytic Institute, the writer has given three talks on Chekhov at the annual convention of the American Psychoanalytic Association. She collaborates in these presentations with the distinguished senior analyst Dr. Silvia M.V. Bell.

== Publications ==
- No Harm Done, Dalkey Archive Press, 2017
- Ocean State, Johns Hopkins University Press, 2010
- A Bad and Stupid Girl, University of Michigan Press, 2006
- Dream Date, Johns Hopkins University Press, 2001
- Gallagher's Travels, Baltimore: Johns Hopkins University Press, 1997
- Home At Last: The Johns Hopkins University Press, 1994
- The Courage of Girls, New Brunswick: Rutgers University Press, 1991
- The Very Rich Hours, Baltimore: The Johns Hopkins University Press, 1987
- Airs of Providence, Baltimore: The Johns Hopkins University Press, 1985

== Prizes, Awards, and Grants ==
- University of Michigan Fiction Prize, 2006
- Bread Loaf Fellowship, 1989
- Towson State University Prize for Literature, 1988
- National Endowment for the Arts Fellowship for 1987–88, 1985
- Southern Review, Louisiana State University Short Fiction Prize
- Pushcart Prize, 1988
