= Joanne Davila =

American psychologist and academic

- Occupation: Professor of Psychology

Academic background
- Education: University of California, Los Angeles; New York University

Joanne Davila (born 1966) is a clinical psychologist known for her research on the romantic relationships and mental health of adolescents and adults, including the impact of social media use on relationships and wellbeing, and on LGBTQ+ relationships and wellbeing. She is a Distinguished Professor and Chair of the Department of Psychology at Stony Brook University.

In 2017, Stony Brook University honored Davila with the Chancellor’s Award for Excellence in Faculty Service. Davila is a Fellow of the American Psychological Association (Division 12, Society for Clinical Psychology), the Association for Psychological Science, and the Association for Behavioral and Cognitive Therapies.

Davila was the Editor-in-Chief of the Journal of Consulting and Clinical Psychology from 2016-2022. She served as the 2020 President of the Society for a Science of Clinical Psychology.

== Biography ==
Davila graduated with a B.A. cum laude with honors in psychology from New York University in 1988. She attended graduate school at University of California, Los Angeles (UCLA) where she obtained her Ph.D. degree in clinical psychology in 1993 under the supervision of Constance Hammen. Davila remained at UCLA for five more years as a post-doctoral fellow working for Tom Bradbury (1993-1996) and a visiting assistant professor (1996-1998). Davila was on the faculty of University at Buffalo (1998-2002) before moving to Stony Brook University in 2002.

Her research on change and stability in adult attachment security has been funded by grants from the National Science Foundation and the National Institute of Mental Health (NIMH).

Davila writes a blog titled Skills for Healthy Relationships for Psychology Today which offers evidence-based skills to improve romantic relationships. She co-authored (with Kaycee Lashman) The Thinking Girl's Guide to the Right Guy: How Knowing Yourself Can Help You Navigate Dating, Hookups, and Love. She co-edited (with Kieran Sullivan) the volume Support Processes in Intimate Relationships.

Davila was appointed by the Academy of Psychological Clinical Science (APCS) Executive Committee to serve on the Board of Directors of the Psychological Clinical Science Accreditation System (PCSAS) in 2021. She was appointed to the position of Board President in June 2023.

== Representative publications ==
- Davila, J., Burge, D., & Hammen, C. (1997). Why does attachment style change? Journal of Personality and Social Psychology, 73 (4), 826–838.
- Davila, J., Hammen, C., Burge, D., Paley, B., & Daley, S. E. (1995). Poor interpersonal problem solving as a mechanism of stress generation in depression among adolescent women. Journal of Abnormal Psychology, 104(4), 592–600.
- Davila, J., Hershenberg, R., Feinstein, B. A., Gorman, K., Bhatia, V., & Starr, L. R. (2012). Frequency and quality of social networking among young adults: Associations with depressive symptoms, rumination, and corumination. Psychology of Popular Media Culture, 1 (2), 72–86.
- Davila, J., & Kashy, D. A. (2009). Secure base processes in couples: Daily associations between support experiences and attachment security. Journal of Family Psychology, 23(1), 76–88.
- Davila, J., Steinberg, S. J., Kachadourian, L., Cobb, R., & Fincham, F. (2004). Romantic involvement and depressive symptoms in early and late adolescence: The role of a preoccupied relational style. Personal Relationships, 11(2), 161–178.
- Davila, J., Mattanah, J., Bhatia, V., Latack, J. A., Feinstein, B. A., Eaton, N. R., Daks, J. Kumar, S., Lomash, E., McCormick, M., & Zhou, J. (2017). Romantic Competence, Healthy Relationship Functioning, and Well-Being in Emerging Adults. Personal Relationships, 24, 162-184.
- Davila, J., Jabbour, J., Dyar, C., & Feinstein, B. A. (2019). Bi+ visibility: Characteristics of those who attempt to make their bisexual+ identity visible and the strategies they use. Archives of Sexual Behavior, 48, 199-211. DOI: 10.1007/s10508-018-1284-6
- Davila, J., Feinstein, B. A., Dyar, C., Jabbour, J. (2020). How, when, and why do bisexual+ individuals attempt to make their identity visible? Psychology of Sexual Orientation and Gender Diversity, 18, 94-105. https://doi.org/10.1037/sgd0000411
- Davila, J., Zhou, J., Nerona, J., Bhatia, V., & Mize, L. (2021). Teaching romantic competence skills to emerging adults: Preliminary findings from a relationship education workshop. Personal Relationships, 28, 251-275.
- Vilkin, E. & Davila, J. (2023). Characteristics of Relationship Agreements and Associations with Relationship Functioning Among People with Diverse Relationship Structures. Journal of Social and Personal Relationships.
- Brandt, S. A., Sullivan, T. J., Luginbuehl, T., O'Leary, K. D., & Davila, J. (2023). Associations between internalized heterosexism, verbal intimacy, and affectionate touch provision among sexual minority couples. Couple and Family Psychology: Research and Practice. Advance online publication. https://doi.org/10.1037/cfp0000245.
- Bibby, E. S. & Davila, J. (in press). A dyadic assessment of the association between sexual communication and daily sexual satisfaction. Journal of Social and Personal Relationships. https://doi.org/10.1177/0265407523122004.
