= Mitchell B. Fox =

American businessman

Mitchell B. Fox is an American businessman. He was the group president and publishing director of Condé Nast Publications, the president and CEO of The Golf Digest Companies, and publisher of Vanity Fair and Details magazines. Fox was the vice president and publisher of Vanity Fair during its rise in the 1990s. As group president, his responsibilities included overseeing Condé Nast's golf properties, its Fairchild fashion group including W magazine and Women's Wear Daily, its Bridal group, and other magazines, including Self, Allure, Bon Appetit, and Condé Nast Traveler.

== Early career ==
Fox joined Condé Nast in 1989 when he became publisher of Details. While Fox was publisher, Details was awarded "Magazine of the Year" (1994) by AdAge, and twice earned top ten honors (1993 and 1994) on AdWeek magazine's "Hot List". He received criticism from The Baltimore Sun and The Philadelphia Inquirer, who stated the ads in Details were "racy" and "raunchy", to which he replied "It's completely consistent with the value system our readers have." The New York Times called Fox's leadership at Details "one of Conde Nast's big success stories" with 41% increase in circulation in 1993.

== Vanity Fair ==
In 1994, Fox was appointed publisher of Vanity Fair. In 1996 Fox was named Condé Nast Publisher of the Year with a record number of ad pages, totaling 1,523 in 1996. Fox's leadership at Vanity Fair went on to break more records with 1,809 ad pages in 1997, and again with 1,882 ad pages in 1998, including fashion ads up 14% and beauty ads up 19%. According to Advertising Age, since Fox's arrival at Vanity Fair from Details in 1994, ad sales at Vanity Fair had risen by a "staggering 69%” by 1998. During his time as publisher of Vanity Fair, the magazine began its annual Academy Awards party.

== Condé Nast ==
In 1997, Fox was appointed vice-president of Condé Nast in charge of Corporate Sales. In November 1999, he was promoted to senior vice president of corporate sales. In 2001, Fox was named president and CEO of The Golf Digest Company, Advance Publications' titles Golf Digest, Golf for Women, Golf World, Golf World Business, and GolfDigest.com upon acquisition of these titles from The New York Times Company. In January 2007, Fox took over most of Mary Berner's responsibilities upon her departure from Condé Nast, adding W, WWD, DNR, FootWear News, The Condé Nast Bridal Group, and Bon Appétit to his existing responsibilities. Fox became group president of Condé Nast in 2007 and was named one of the leaders of the magazine world by AdAge.

== Departure from Condé Nast ==
In early January 2008, Fox was terminated by Condé Nast. The New York Times reported his departure as sudden "high-level shake-up" among management at Condé Nast, in which his multi-media, multi-platform strategy conflicted with existing plans for the company, leading to his ouster. The Post described this event, which coincided with the ousting of Lucky magazine's publisher, as "a bloodbath at Condé Nast". Some media reports suggest the death of a longtime ally may explain his sudden departure from the company, and tabloids suggest motives of a rival, but many media sources do not provide information on the reason for his departure. The email he sent upon departure and the company's memo were leaked to BusinessWeek.

From Conde Nast, Fox became president/CEO of 8020 Media Company, a San Francisco web based media company that manages two online communities and magazines. 8020 Media was sold to a group of investors in 2010.

Fox was a national trustee of The First Tee, a charitable organization, and is a member of the Esteemed Council of Advisors for the Telluride Film Festival. Fox also represented his company as a member of the board of directors of the Magazine Publishers of America (MPA), and was a member of its executive committee.

== History ==
Fox graduated from the State University of Stony Brook in 1977. He began his career at The New York Times where he worked for seven years, ultimately as Group Manager, Retail Advertising. In 1984, Fox left The New York Times to join Bergdorf Goodman as the advertising director. He was later promoted to senior vice president of sales promotion at Bergdorf Goodman.

== Currently ==
Fox lives in New York City and has created a holding company (WGA Global Marketing, Inc.) with multiple businesses. He sits on the board of advisors of both the College of Business and the School of Journalism at Stony Brook University. Fox has also been a distinguished speaker at Stanford Business School and Northwestern's Medill School of Journalism. He served for two years at Pitney Bowes as the Executive Business Development Strategist in their global ecommerce division working with retailers and online merchants to grow their business globally. Fox has also become involved in MyGrove as senior advisor, a media company that targets active adult communities.

Fox was recruited to serve on the board of advisors of Viridian Capital Advisors, the leading investment bank in the cannabis industry. In 2016, he was recruited to be on the board of directors of Civilized.Life, a Los Angeles/Canada-based media company focused on the cannabis industry.
