= Kathleen M. McGarry =

American economist

- Citizenship: United States
- Education: Stony Brook University (B.A. 1986) (PhD 1992)
- Scientific career
- Fields: Economics
- Workplaces: Stony Brook University; University of California, Los Angeles
- Website: https://www.stonybrook.edu/commcms/economics/people/_bios/MCGARRY.php

Kathleen M. McGarry is a Professor and Chair in the Department of Economics at the University of California, Los Angeles. From 2023-2024 she was the Thomas Muench Endowed Chair of Economics at Stony Brook University. She is also a Research Associate of the National Bureau of Economic Research and a co-investigator of the Health and Retirement Survey. From 2007 to 2009, she was Joel Z. and Susan Hyatt ‘72 Professor in the Department of Economics at Dartmouth College. She has served on the Editorial Boards of the American Economic Journal: Public Policy, the American Journal of Health Economics, and the Journal of Pension Economics.

She was awarded numerous teaching awards at UCLA.

== Research ==
McGarry's dozens of publications focus on the economics of aging, including public and private transfers, such as those between parents and children as well as the Supplemental Security Income, Social Security, and Medicare programs. She has also studied the market for long-term care. Her most-cited paper, with Amy Finkelstein, on the long-term care insurance market, was the first work cited in the award of the John Bates Clark Medal to Finkelstein. This work showed that there is little relationship between the probability people will need such insurance and the probability that they will purchase this insurance, because people vary in two different ways: how much they believe they will need this insurance, and how cautious they are, and these two different types of variation act in opposite ways.

=== Selected works ===
- Finkelstein, Amy, and Kathleen McGarry. "Multiple dimensions of private information: evidence from the long-term care insurance market." American Economic Review 96, no. 4 (2006): 938–958.
- Hurd, Michael D., and Kathleen McGarry. "Evaluation of the subjective probabilities of survival in the health and retirement study." Journal of Human resources (1995): S268-S292.
- McGarry, Kathleen, and Robert F. Schoeni. "Transfer behavior in the health and retirement study: Measurement and the redistribution of resources within the family." Journal of Human resources (1995): S184-S226.
- Hurd, Michael D., and Kathleen McGarry. "The predictive validity of subjective probabilities of survival." The Economic Journal 112, no. 482 (2002): 966–985.
- McGarry, Kathleen. "Inter vivos transfers and intended bequests." Journal of Public Economics 73, no. 3 (1999): 321–351.
