= Robert McGarry IV =

American football player (born 1985)

- Born: November 15, 1985 (age 39); Stillwater, Minnesota, U.S.

Robert McGarry IV (born November 15, 1985) is a former American football player. As a senior at Stillwater High School, he recorded 65 tackles and was selected as an all-conference defensive lineman. He enrolled at the University of Minnesota where he played football as a long snapper from 2005 to 2008. He played in all 12 games for the Gophers in his freshman and sophomore years, all 13 games as a junior, and all 12 games as a senior. McGarry was also selected as a member of the All-Big Ten academic teams. In 49 games from his freshman to senior seasons, McGarry executed over 450 plays without an errant snap. In April 2008, McGarry was honored by the National Football Foundation & College Football Hall of Fame as a member of the 2008 NFF Hampshire Honor Society.
