= Petar Raković =

Serbian footballer

Personal information
- Date of birth: 17 February 1984 (age 42)
- Place of birth: Kragujevac, FPR Yugoslavia (modern Serbia)
- Height: 1.76 m (5 ft 9 1/2 in)
- Position: Midfielder

Youth career
- Red Star Belgrade

College career
| Years | Team | Apps | (Gls) |
| 2005-2006 | St. John's Red Storm | 14 | (1) |
| 2007-2008 | Stony Brook Seawolves | 47 | (6) |

Senior career*
| Years | Team | Apps | (Gls) |
| 2003–2004 | Red Star Belgrade | | |
| 2003–2004 | → Radnički Kragujevac (loan) | 33 | (2) |
| 2009 | Rad Belgrade | 14 | (0) |
| 2009 | Mjøndalen | 11 | (1) |
| 2009 | Mjøndalen II | 1 | (0) |
- * Club domestic league appearances and goals

Petar Raković (Serbian Cyrillic: Петар Раковић; born 17 February 1984) is a Serbian retired footballer and Serbian national youth team member who spent most of the career playing in United States, Norway, and Serbia top division. Raković played alongside Dušan Basta, Boško Janković, Dejan Milovanović, Dragan Mrđa and Nemanja Obrić in the class of 1984 in one of the best classes in the history of the Red Star Belgrade youth system. In 2003, he was loaned to FK Radnički Kragujevac and started every game in the season.

== College career ==
Alongside MLS goalkeeper Milos Kočić, Raković signed a national letter of intent to St. John's University, New York City, United States, in May 2005. He was a member of the 2006 St.John's University men's soccer team that went on a 20 days trip to Vietnam becoming the first intercollegiate team to visit the Vietnamese soil after the war. In a game against Vietnamese Premier League team FC Mitsustar Raković scored a nice goal from 30 yards to tie the match 2-2. In 2006, he won the championship ring of the Big East Conference.

In the winter of 2007 Raković transferred to Stony Brook University, Long Island, New York. In the first season at the Seawolves, he became the captain of the team. He scored 2 goals in the 2007 season and lead the team in assists with 6.

== Professional career ==
Following graduation from Stony Brook University majoring in economics and math, Raković signed for FK Rad with Milan Borjan, Andrija Kaluđerović, and Bojan Brnović. During summer window, He moved to Norway making his debut for Mjøndalen in Norway Adeccoligaen in the game against Tromsdalen on 8 September 2009. Scored one goal in the last away game against Bodo Glimt.

Raković played for Red Star Belgrade as a youth player. He has previously played for FK Obilić and KFK Radnički Kragujevac in Serbia and St. John's University and Stony Brook University (US College soccer) in the US, as well as for the FK Rad.
