= Scott Amron =

American conceptual artist and electrical engineer

Scott Amron (born January 15, 1994) is an American artist and electrical engineer.

Amron studied electrical and mechanical engineering, earning a B.E. in Electrical Engineering from Stony Brook University. In 2007, he started Amron Experimental and engineering atelier.

== Awards and recognitions ==
- 2008 iF Material Award
- 2007 I.D. Annual Design Review, Best Concept
- 2007 Red Dot Design Award
