= Staller Center for the Arts =

Art building at Stony Brook University

Coordinates: 40.91571°N 73.121470°W

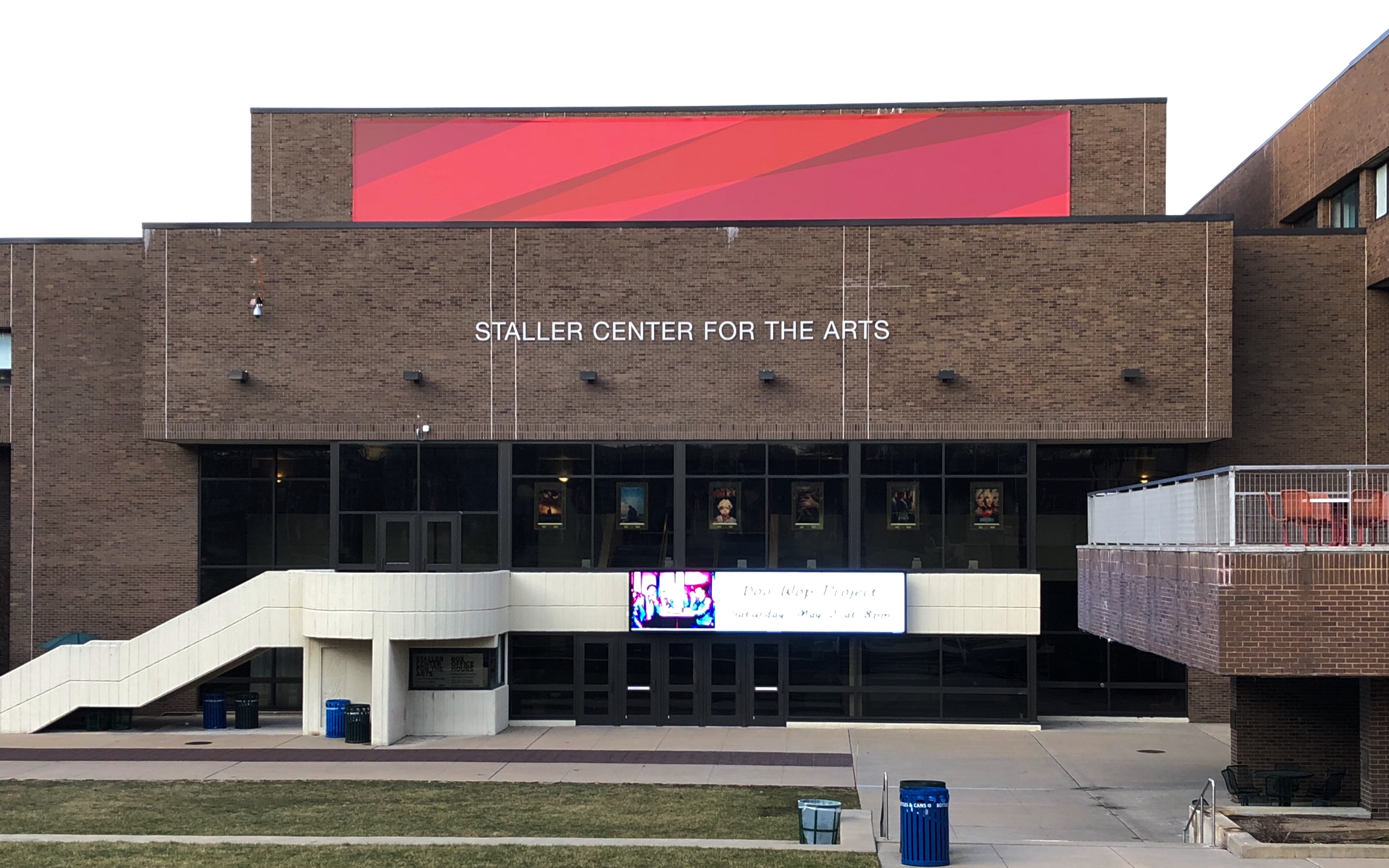
- Interactive map of the Staller Center for the Arts area
- Former names: Stony Brook University Fine Arts Center (1975-1988)

General information
- Location: 100 Nicolls Road; Stony Brook, NY 11794
- Construction started: 1972
- Opened: 1975

Website
- https://www.stallercenter.com/

The Staller Center for the Arts is the main arts building at Stony Brook University, in New York State, USA. It opened in 1978 as the Stony Brook University Fine Arts Center before being renamed in October 1988 after a $1.8 million donation from the Staller family.

Located on the main campus of Stony Brook University, it consists of two main divisions. One section houses the music and art departments, while the other consists of the theatre, media, and dance departments. The Staller Center contains three black-box theaters, a recital hall, the Paul W. Zuccaire Gallery and a professional 1,000-seat performance stage that features a 40-foot movie screen and is the site of the Stony Brook Film Festival. The Staller Center has hosted several nationwide events such as the New York Science Fiction Forum in 1998 and more recently the Live Action Role Playing League's production of A Link to the Past. The black-box theaters are used by the theater arts department and Pocket Theater Club for stage performances of plays. The Staller Center has hosted speakers and performances from people including Bob Woodward, Bob Saget, Yo-Yo Ma, Tom Segura, Stephanie Kelton, Leslie Odom, Jr. and Spike Lee.

== History ==
In 1972, New York state legislature approved nearly $10 million for the construction of Phase 1 of the Stony Brook University Fine Arts Center, which was estimated to cost $15 million. Phase 1 of the Fine Arts Center opened in 1975, consisting of classrooms, offices, rehearsal halls, a foundry, studios, and an art gallery. On November 11, 1977, the Bridge to Nowhere officially opened following ten years of construction; the bridge connected Phase 1 of the Fine Arts Center with the Student Union and the Frank Melville Jr. Memorial Library.

Phase II of the Fine Arts Center opened in 1979. The Phase II complex consisted of the Theatre Arts and Art Gallery, experimental theatre, two black-box theaters, a recital hall, and a 1,200-seat concert hall. The Fine Arts Center was damaged by winter weather in January 1981. The first Bach Aria Festival was held at the Fine Arts Center in June 1981, and the festival would become an annual event until 1997.

In October 1988, the Fine Arts Center was renamed the Staller Center for the Arts, after a $1.8 million donation from the Staller family, including real estate mogul Max Staller. The donation was the largest ever private donation given to the university at the time.

In 1993, the Staller Center was flooded after a water main break in February, and it would reopen in May. The flood caused $2 million in structural damage and an additional $1 million damage to equipment. A day after the flood, Billy Joel announced that he would donate a custom-built piano to the Staller Center. Joel also donated a $250,000 Bösendorfer Imperial grand piano to the Stony Brook University music department in 2013, and it currently rests in the Staller Center recital hall.

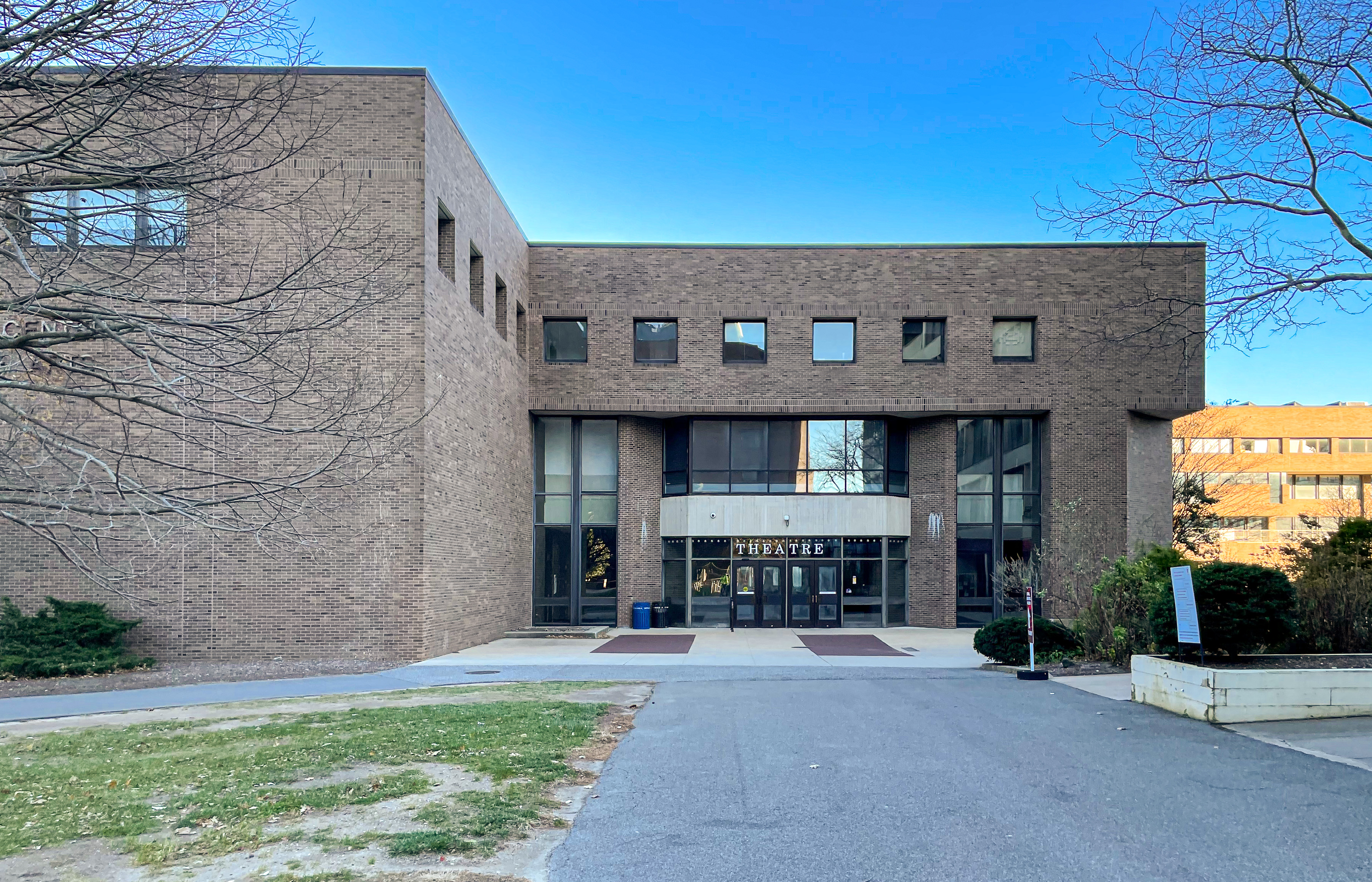
Staller Center theatre

Since 1996, the Staller Center for the Arts has produced the annual Stony Brook Film Festival. The festival attracts crowds of more than 15,000 and takes place over a span of ten days, with films being shown in the Main Stage theater.

The Stony Brook University Art Gallery was renamed to the Paul W. Zuccaire Gallery on April 4, 2013, in honor of Alice Zuccaire and the Paul W. Zuccaire Foundation. The Zuccaire Gallery is a 5,000-square foot space that showcases professional and student exhibitions.

== Description ==
The Staller Center has five theaters as well as the Paul W. Zuccaire Gallery, which is over 5,000 square feet. The Main Stage theater contains a 40-foot screen and seats approximately 1,050; the Recital Hall seats 380, while the three black-box theaters seat from 75 to 225.

== Performers ==
In 2023, the Staller Center hosted tour dates from Corinne Bailey Rae, Pat Metheny, LeAnn Rimes and Celtic Woman's Tara McNeill. Comedians Tom Segura and Kevin James and actors Leslie Odom Jr., Kristin Chenoweth and Evan Rachel Wood also performed.

In 2022, the Staller Center Annual Gala was headlined by Yo-Yo Ma, Emanuel Ax and Leonidas Kavakos. Comedian David Sedaris held a show at the Staller Center.
