= Stony Brook Arena =

Multi-purpose arena in Stony Brook, New York

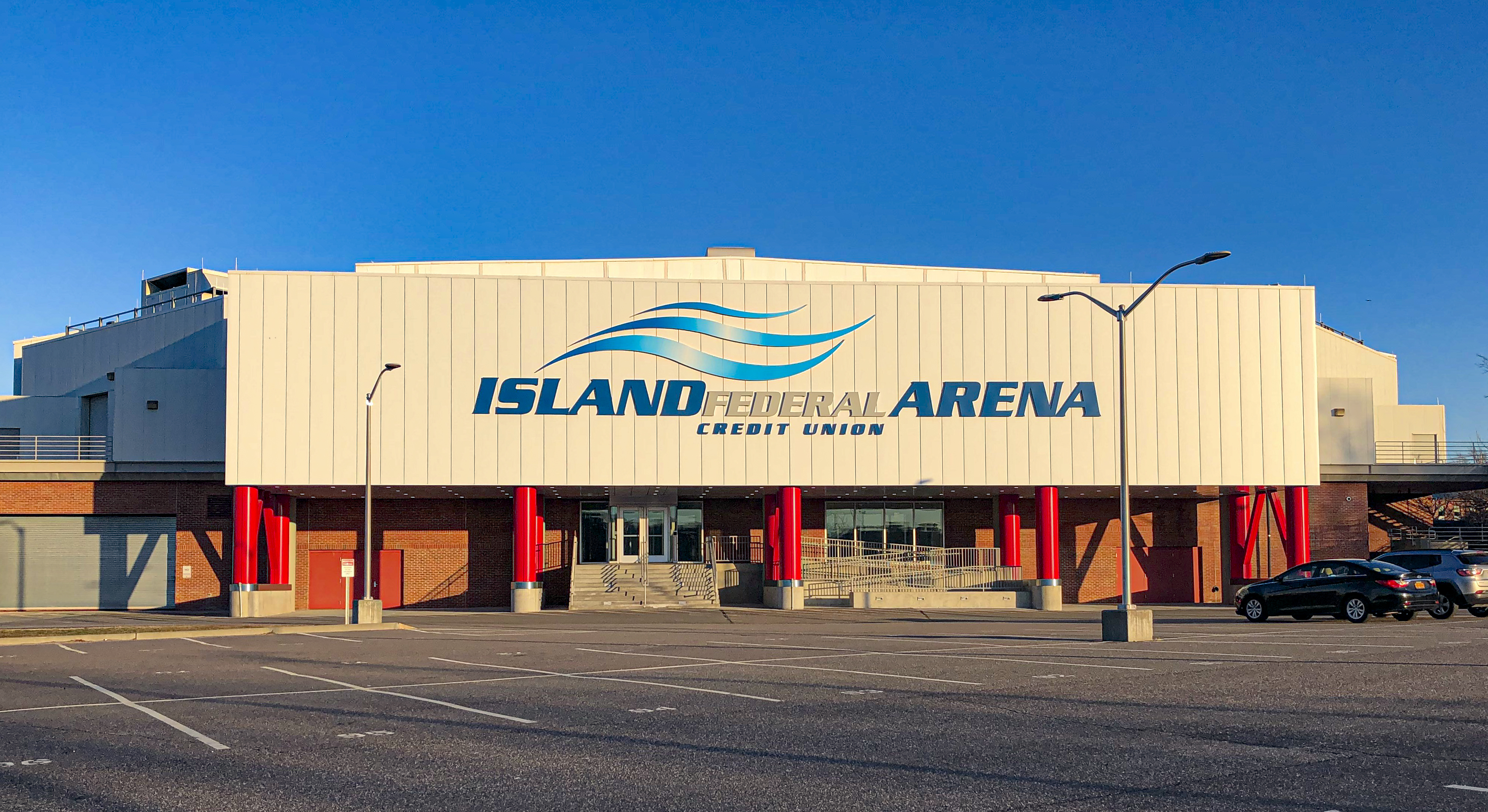
- The exterior of Island Federal Arena
- Interactive map of Stony Brook Arena
- Former names: Stony Brook University Arena (1990–2014); Island Federal Credit Union Arena (2014–2024)
- Location: 100 John S. Toll Drive, Stony Brook, New York, 11790
- Coordinates: 40.91741°N 73.125955°W
- Owner: State University of New York
- Operator: Stony Brook University
- Capacity: 4,160
- Surface: Hardwood

Construction
- Opened: 1990; October 3, 2014 (re-opening)
- Renovated: 2012–2014
- Cost: $17 million $21.1 million renovation

Tenants
- Stony Brook Seawolves (NCAA) (1990–2010, 2014–present); Long Island Surf (USBL) (1991–2001)

Website
- www.stonybrookathletics.com

Stony Brook Arena is a 4,000-seat multi-purpose arena in Stony Brook, New York. It is the home of the Stony Brook Seawolves men's and women's basketball teams.

Originally built in 1990 as the Stony Brook University Arena, it underwent a $21.1 million renovation in 2012–14. Naming rights were sold to a regional credit union, Island Federal Credit Union. From 2014 to 2024, it was known as Island Federal Arena (officially Island Federal Credit Union Arena). The Island Federal Arena has hosted the America East Conference men's basketball tournament finals in 2012 and 2016, as well as the NBA G League Finals in 2019.

It contains four scoreboards and two video boards, plus four luxury suites with 16 seats each. It is also used for concerts, trade shows, conventions, graduations, and other special events.

== History ==
The Stony Brook University Arena opened in 1990 at a construction cost of $17 million. It served as the West Wing for the Stony Brook Indoor Sports Complex.

In April 2008, Stony Brook announced plans to renovate its arena. A $21.1 million renovation of the Stony Brook University Arena was announced with $20 million provided by the State of New York and an additional $1 million provided by private donations. It included a seating capacity for 4,008 spectators, four luxury boxes and a VIP lounge area at the loge level with premium courtside seating. During the renovations, both basketball teams played at Pritchard Gymnasium, which like the Island Federal Credit Union Arena, is part of the Stony Brook Sports Complex.

During the arena's renovation, the basketball court was rotated 90 degrees from its original angle, and the seating bowl was built around it. The old arena contained gaps in the seating bowl, and the renovation faced challenges due to the physical limitations of the original structure.

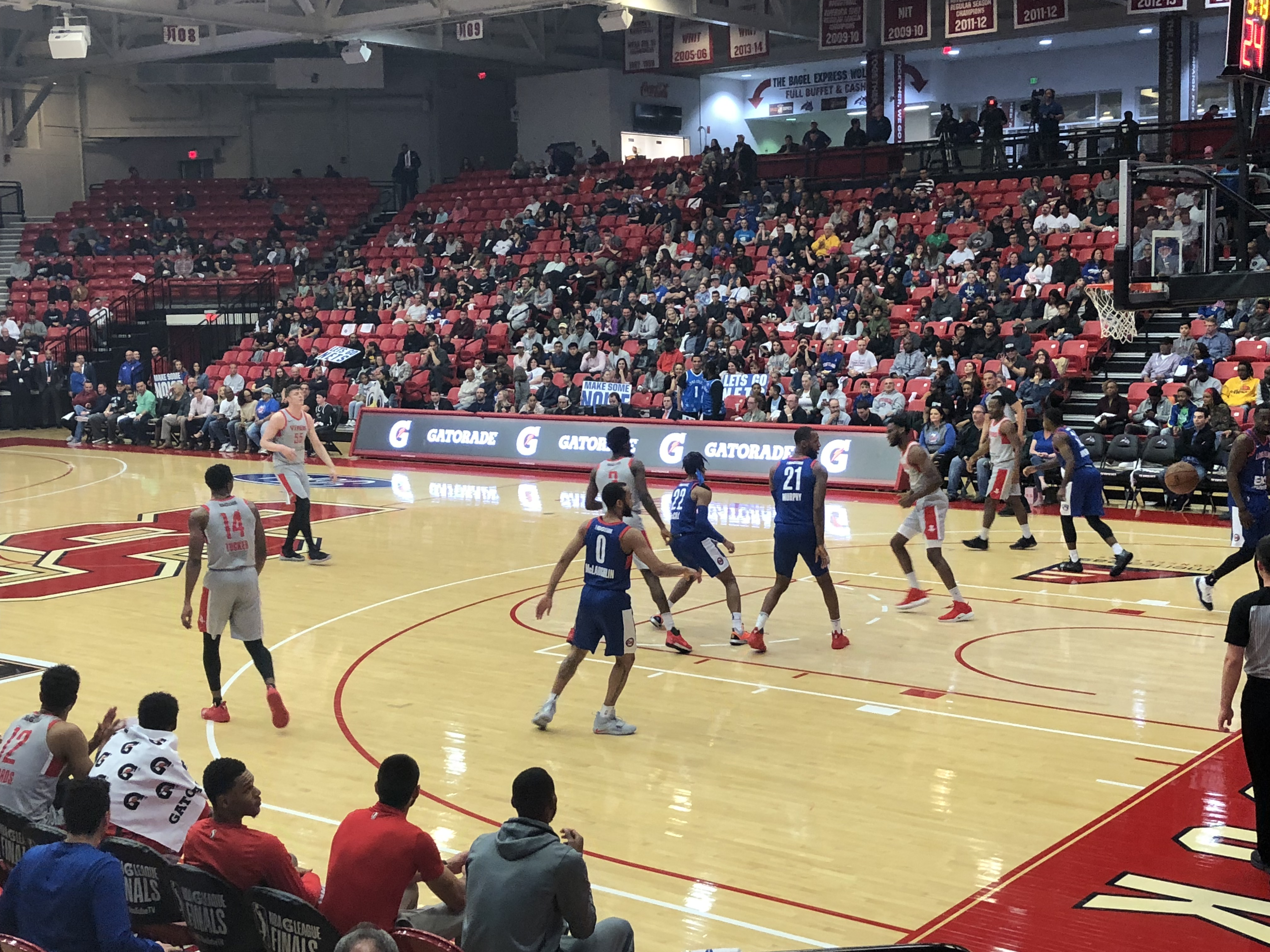
Island Federal Arena during the 2019 G League Finals

The renovation of the arena was completed in 2014. On October 3, 2014, the arena officially reopened with a ribbon-cutting ceremony. The first official general public event to take place at the newly renovated arena was a Harlem Globetrotters game. The arena hosted its first home basketball game on November 14, 2014, and Stony Brook defeated Columbia 57–56 on a game-winning layup.

On October 28, 2014, it was announced that Stony Brook had reached a deal with Island Federal Credit Union to purchase naming rights to the arena for $7 million.

Island Federal Arena served as the home court for the Long Island Nets during the 2019 NBA G League Finals due to conflicts with the Nets' home arena, the Nassau Coliseum.

During the summer of 2019, Island Federal Arena renovated its court, which previously featured the interlocking "SB" logo at mid-court. The new court contains the Seawolves' logo at mid-court, with a silhouette of Long Island that spans the entire length of the floor.

In May 2024, Stony Brook announced that the 2024–25 season would be the last year under the Island Federal Arena name, with the original naming rights contract set to expire and Island Federal opting not to renew the deal.

== Other events ==
Island Federal Arena has also hosted numerous concerts since its 1990 opening as the Stony Brook University Arena. The first concert hosted in the venue was Bob Dylan in 1991. It would not host another concert until 2000 when Sleater-Kinney became the first music act to play the arena in nine years. Concerts in the 2000s were sparse, with only 3 Doors Down & Oleander (2000), Sugar Ray (2001), Kanye West (2004), and Jimmy Eat World & Taking Back Sunday (2005) headlining during the decade.

Since the arena's rebranding as Island Federal Arena, Lupe Fiasco, 3lau, B.o.B, Twenty-One Pilots, Panic! at the Disco, Walk the Moon, Timeflies, Cash Cash, Future, Fetty Wap, Post Malone, 21 Savage, A Boogie wit da Hoodie, A$AP Ferg and Aminé have headlined concerts.

Stony Brook University's winter graduation ceremonies take place at Island Federal Arena.

Speakers include Supreme Court associate Justice Sonia Sotomayor, author Janet Mock and designer Joshua Davis have held talks at Island Federal Arena.

== Gallery ==
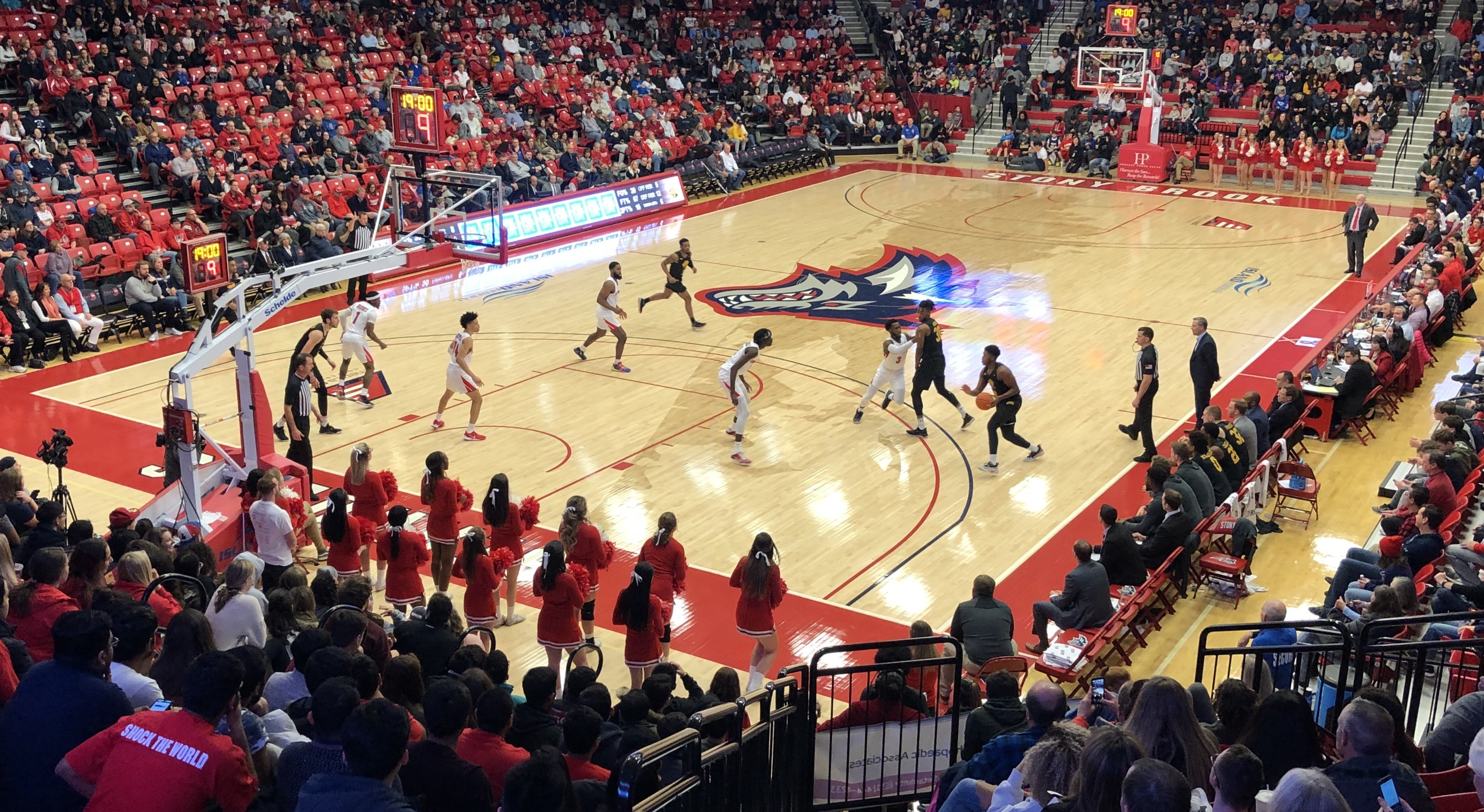
Island Federal Arena in 2020

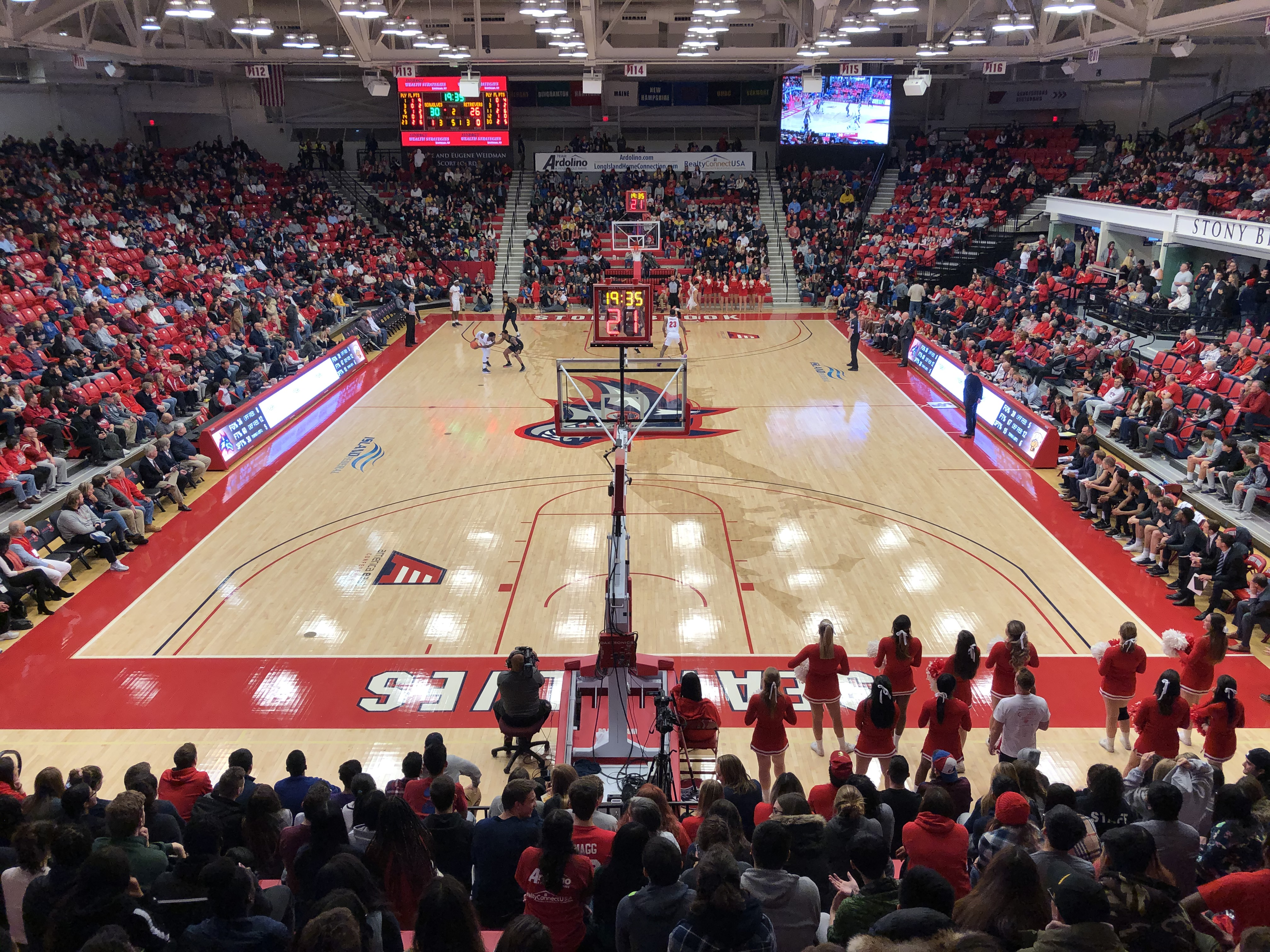
Island Federal Arena in 2020

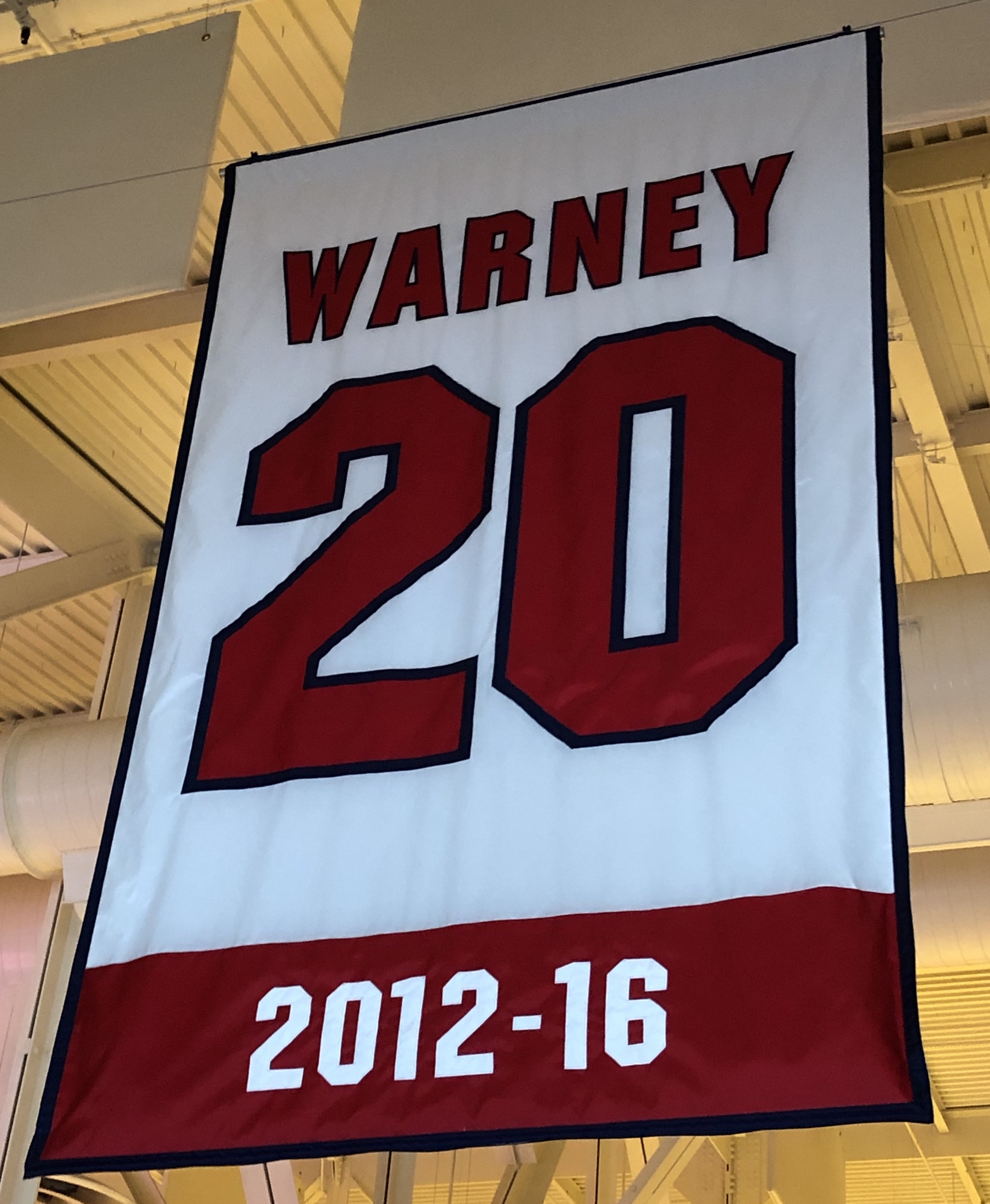
Jameel Warney's retired number in the rafters

Banner commemorating Stony Brook's first NCAA Tournament berth

== See also ==
- List of NCAA Division I basketball arenas
