= Wolfie (disambiguation) =

Wolfie is an American indie rock band.

Wolfie or Wolfy may also refer to:

== People ==
- Martin Adams (born 1956), British darts player
- Wolfie D (born 1973), American wrestler
- Wolfie Kodesh (1918–2002), South African communist party activist
- Wolfgang Van Halen (born 1991), American guitarist

== Fictional characters ==
- Wolfie (Arrowverse), from Legends of Tomorrow
- Wolfie, the lead character in the British TV sitcom Citizen Smith
- Wolfie, from the children's Disney TV series Special Agent Oso
- Wolfie, a character from the television film and television series Casper's Scare School
- Wolfie, a werewolf character from the 1995 film Monster Mash

== School mascots ==
- Wolfie and Wolfie Jr., former and current mascot of the University of Nevada, Reno
- Wolfie the Seawolf, the mascot of Stony Brook University
- Wolfie, the mascot of the American University of Rome

== Films ==
- Wolfy (film), 2009 Russian psychological drama film
- Wolfy, the Incredible Secret, 2013 French-Belgian animated film

== See also ==
- Wolf (disambiguation)
