= Once in a While =

Once in a While may refer to:

- "Once in a While" (1937 song), notably recorded by Tommy Dorsey and Patti Page (separately)
- "Once in a While" (Madeleine Peyroux song), 2007
- "Once in a While" (Timeflies song), 2016
- Once in a While (Dean Martin album), 1978
- Once in a While (Johnny Mathis album), 1988
- Once in a While (Seth MacFarlane album), 2019
- "Once in a While", a 2006 song by Akon from his album Konvicted
