= Stony Brook Seawolves =

Athletic teams of Stony Brook University

- University: Stony Brook University
- Nickname: Seawolves
- NCAA: Division I (FCS)
- Conference: CAA
- Athletic director: Shawn Heilbron
- Location: Stony Brook, New York
- Varsity teams: 18
- Football stadium: Kenneth P. LaValle Stadium
- Basketball arena: Island Federal Credit Union Arena
- Baseball stadium: Joe Nathan Field
- Soccer field: Kenneth P. LaValle Stadium
- Other venues: Pritchard Gymnasium
- Colors: Red, blue, and gray
- Mascot: Wolfie the Seawolf
- Fight song: We're the Red Hot Seawolves...
- Website: stonybrookathletics.com
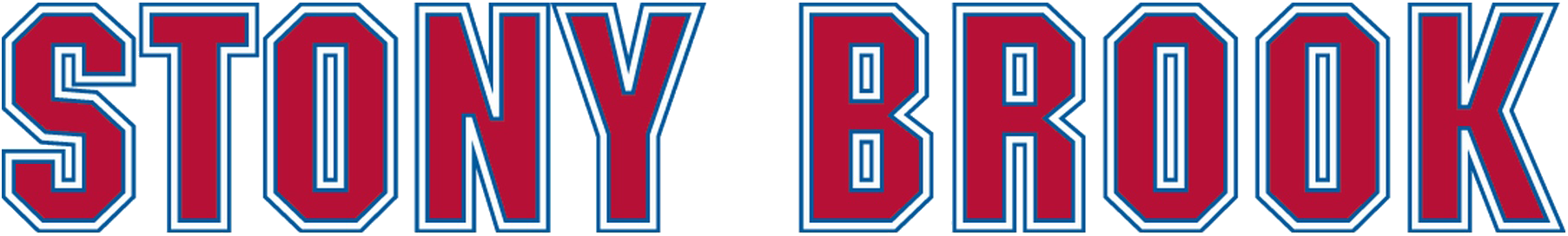

The Stony Brook Seawolves are the intercollegiate athletics teams that represent Stony Brook University (SBU) in Stony Brook, New York. The Seawolves play as members of the Coastal Athletic Association (formerly known as the Colonial Athletic Association), which competes at the NCAA Division I level. Stony Brook had previously been a part of the America East Conference from 2001 to 2022, though has competed in CAA Football since 2013. The university's mascot is Wolfie the Seawolf, and the official colors of the Seawolves are red, grey, and blue.

The Seawolves currently field 18 varsity sports, including football and baseball for men only; softball, swimming and diving, tennis, and volleyball for women only; and basketball, cross country, lacrosse, soccer, and track and field for both genders. The most recent change to Stony Brook's roster of varsity sports was the discontinuation of men's tennis at the end of the 2016–17 school year.

== Varsity teams ==
Men's sports	Women's sports
Baseball	Basketball
Basketball	Cross country
Cross country	Lacrosse
Football	Soccer
Lacrosse	Softball
Soccer	Swimming & diving
Track and field^{1}	Tennis
	Track and field^{1}
	Volleyball
^{1} – includes both indoor and outdoor.

Stony Brook University sponsors teams in seven men's and 10 women's NCAA sanctioned sports and is a full member of the Coastal Athletic Association, with the football program competing in that conference's technically separate football league of CAA Football. Before joining the all-sports CAA, Stony Brook had been a member of the America East Conference, with women's tennis as an associate member of the Missouri Valley Conference.

=== Football ===
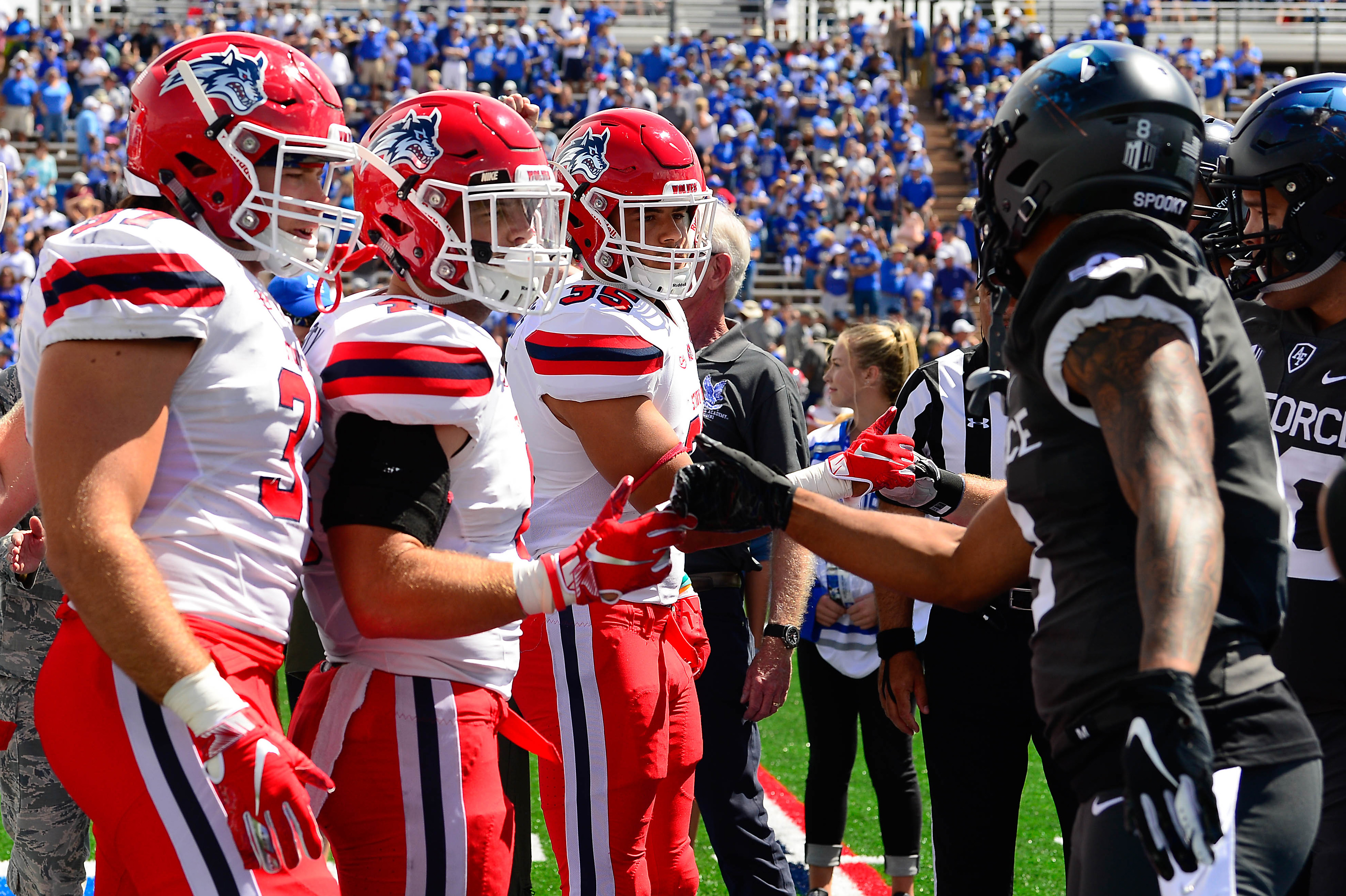
Stony Brook football captains shake hands with Air Force football players before a game in 2018

Stony Brook first fielded a football team in 1984 as the Division III Stony Brook Patriots. In 1995, the team rose to Division II and changed the team name to the Seawolves. The team ascended to Division I in 1999, joining the Northeast Conference, where they won a share of the conference championship title for the first time in 2005. The program left the NEC and spent one year as a Division I-AA independent in 2007. From there, the Seawolves joined the Big South Conference in 2008 as a football-only member. Stony Brook won four straight Big South titles from 2009 to 2012, and made their first appearance in the FCS Playoffs in 2011, where they beat in-state rivals Albany at Kenneth P. LaValle Stadium 31–28 in the first round before losing to top-seeded Sam Houston State in the second round. In 2012, the Seawolves returned to the FCS Playoffs, beating Villanova 20–10 at home in the first round before losing to Montana State. Stony Brook has beaten one FBS opponent, Army, with a 23–3 victory in 2012.

In August 2012, Stony Brook accepted an offer to join CAA Football. The team struggled initially, failing to put up a winning record during their first four seasons in the conference. However, the Seawolves finished 10–3 and second place in 2017, returning to the playoffs, where they beat Lehigh 59–29 in the first round but lost to James Madison in the second round. In 2018, the Seawolves made the FCS Playoffs for a second straight year but lost to Southeast Missouri State 28–14 in the first round.

=== Men's basketball ===
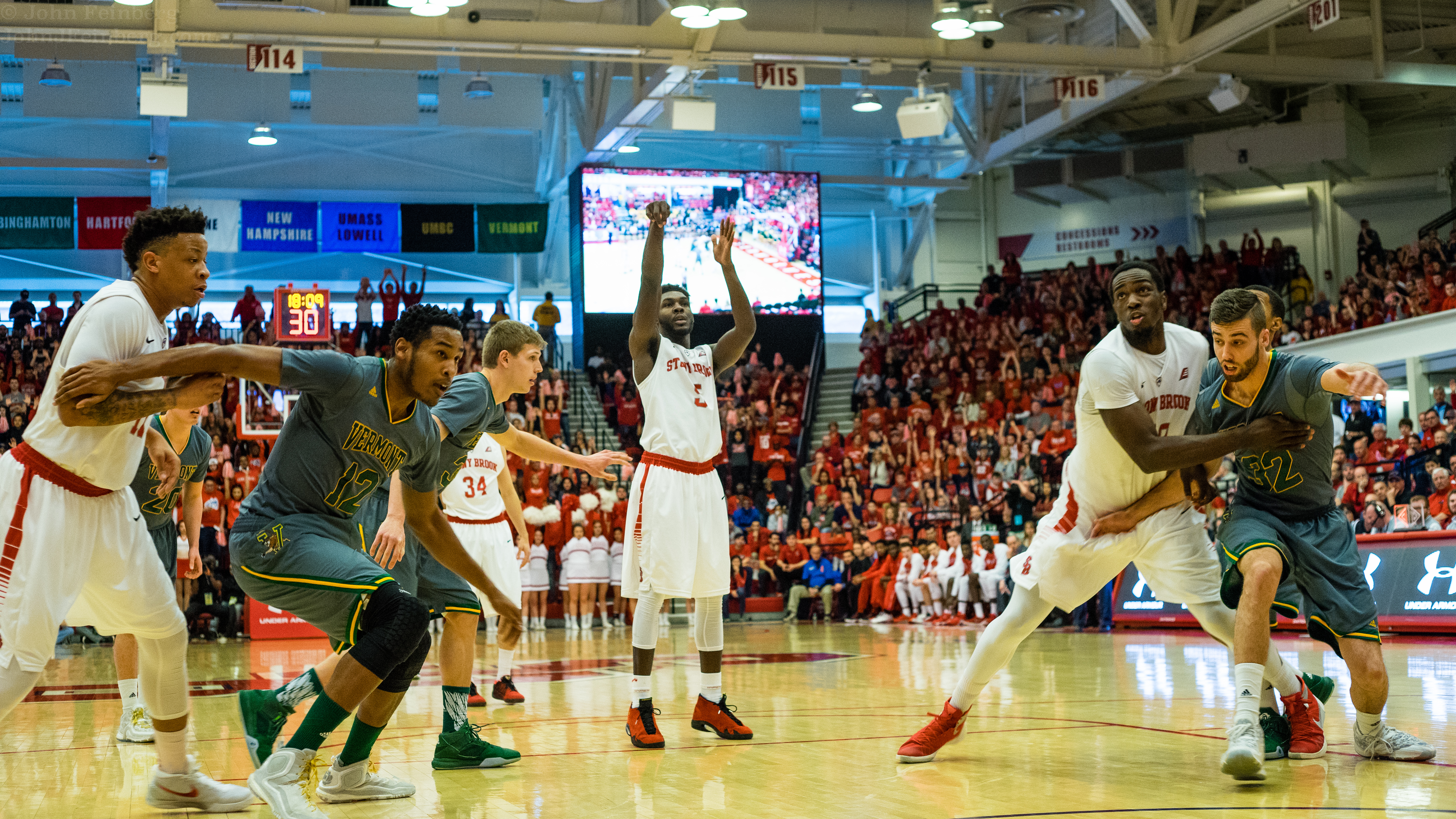
Stony Brook playing in the 2016 America East Conference men's basketball championship game at Island Federal Credit Union Arena

Stony Brook men's basketball was founded in 1960 at the Division III level. When the Seawolves moved to Division I in 1999, they spent the first two years as an independent before accepting an invitation to join the America East in 2001. In 2005, Stony Brook hired Steve Pikiell to become the tenth head coach in program history. In the six seasons before his arrival, the Seawolves had gone 63–107. After going 20–67 in his first three seasons, Pikiell led Stony Brook to their first winning record as a Division I program after the 2008–09 season, ending the season 16–14 (8–8 America East).

In 2009–10, Stony Brook won their first America East regular season title after a 21–8 (13–3) season, but lost to Boston University in the semifinals of the America East Tournament. The Seawolves were invited to participate in the NIT, but fell in the first round to Illinois in a sellout crowd at the Stony Brook Sports Complex. Despite finishing the 2010–11 season with a 13–16 (8–8) record, the Seawolves entered the America East Tournament as the No. 5 seed and beat Albany and top seed Vermont to earn their first ever trip to the America East Finals. They fell to the Boston Terriers 56–54 in the closing seconds despite leading for most of the game.

The 2011–12 season saw the Seawolves return to the NIT after winning their second America East regular season title, finishing 22–10 (14–2), losing to Seton Hall in the first round. The Seawolves won their first NIT game in 2013 against UMass but lost to Iowa in the second round, capping off a 25–8 (14–2) season where they won their third America East regular season title. Stony Brook would lose to Albany in two straight America East Finals in 2014 and 2015, the second coming on a buzzer-beater three.

Stony Brook finally made their first NCAA Tournament appearance after besting Vermont in the 2016 America East Finals. As the No. 13 seed, they lost to Kentucky in the first round. Pikiell left the program three days later to accept the head coaching job at Rutgers. In April, longtime Ohio State assistant coach Jeff Boals was hired to be Pikiell's successor. After three seasons, Boals resigned in March 2019 to accept the head coaching position at Ohio University. Boals went 55–41 in three seasons at Stony Brook, including a 24–8 record, his first 20-win season, in his final year.

=== Women's basketball ===
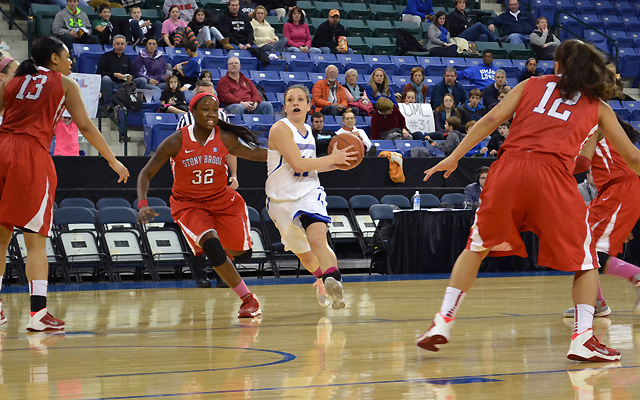
A basketball game between Stony Brook and UMass Lowell in 2014

Stony Brook reached the America East championship game in 2002 and 2014, but lost to Hartford 60–57 and Albany 70–46, respectively. The Seawolves did not win an America East regular season or tournament championship until 2020, when Stony Brook had a 28–3 record. However, the season was cut short before the America East championship game against Maine as a result of the COVID-19 pandemic. Stony Brook was still named both regular season and tournament champions. In 2021, Stony Brook reached the America East championship game against Maine in a rematch of the game that was canceled because of the pandemic. As the No. 2 seed, Stony Brook upset No. 1 seed Maine 64–60 to win their 2nd straight America East championship and reach their first ever NCAA Tournament. Stony Brook was given a No. 14 seed in the 2021 NCAA tournament and lost to No. 3 seed Arizona, the eventual tournament runners-up, 79–44 in the first round.

Head coach Caroline McCombs left for George Washington weeks later. In McCombs' final three years, Stony Brook went 66–17. Her successor was James Madison assistant Ashley Langford. Langford led Stony Brook to wins over St. John's, Rutgers and Washington State in her first year.

=== Baseball ===
Since joining Division I in 2002, Stony Brook has won six conference tournaments: 2004, 2008, 2010, 2012, 2015, and 2019. The Seawolves have participated NCAA tournament six times, winning their first game ever in the NCAA tournament in 2010 against North Carolina State. They are coached by Matt Senk, who has led the team since 1991.

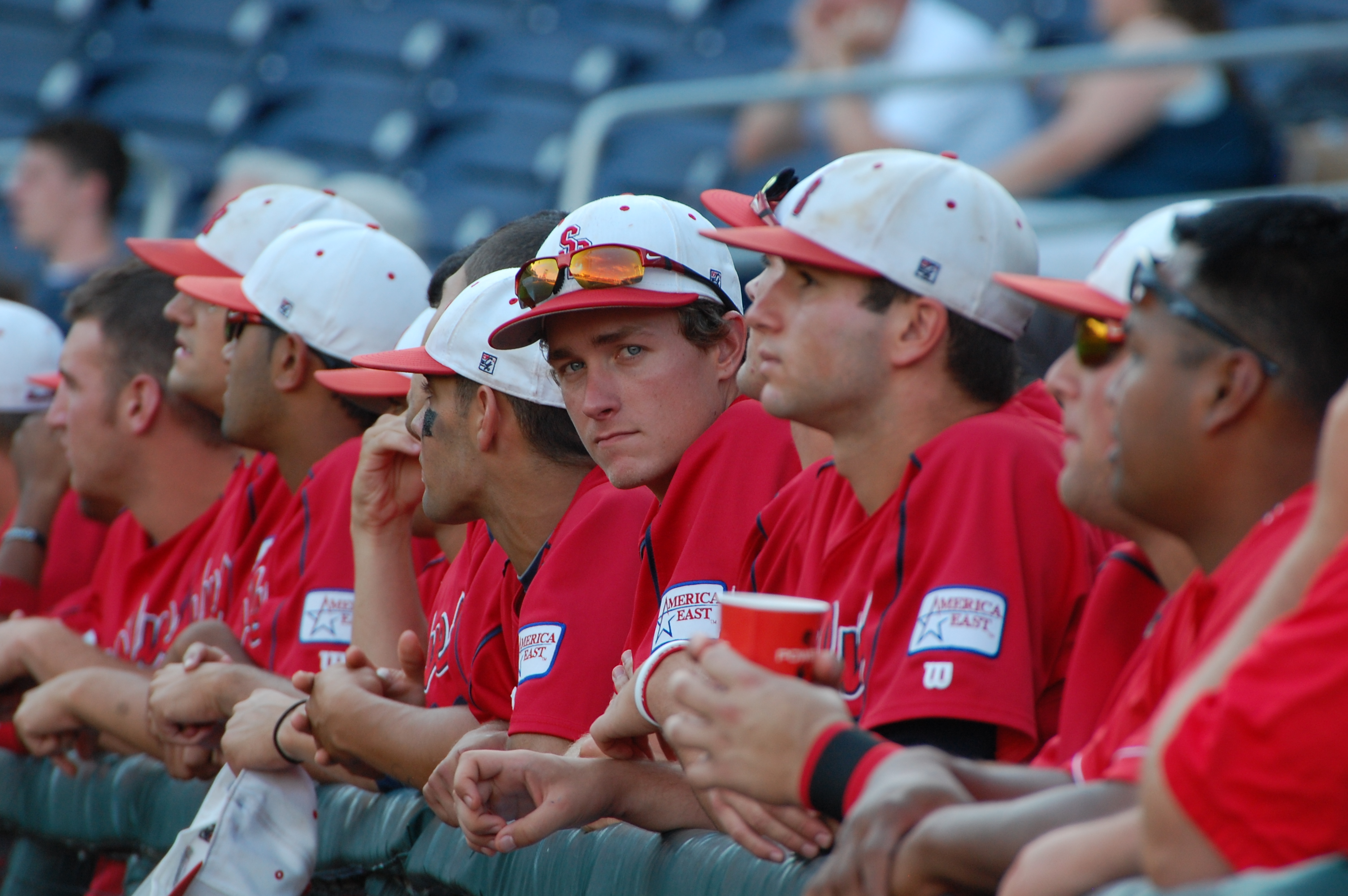
Stony Brook baseball players at the 2012 College World Series

The 2012 season was a breakthrough for Stony Brook baseball. The team won 10 consecutive games en route to their second consecutive regular season championship, and ended the regular season 43–11 (21–3 America East). Stony Brook won the America East Tournament to earn the program's fourth title, beating Maine 13–6 in the finals to advance to the 2012 NCAA Division I baseball tournament with a 46–11 record, the best record in Division I. For the first time in the history of the program, Stony Brook was ranked at No. 25 in the Baseball America poll and No. 29 in the NCBWA poll.

Stony Brook played in the Coral Gables Regional as the fourth seed. The Seawolves topped Central Florida to win the regional and advance to face the LSU Tigers in the Super Regionals. In the Super Regional, Stony Brook defeated LSU and advanced to the College World Series. Stony Brook was ranked No. 7 in the NCBWA poll, their highest ranking ever, but suffered consecutive losses against UCLA and Florida State to end their run to the College World Series, finishing the season 52–15, the most wins by any Division I team in 2012. Seven players from the Stony Brook baseball team were selected in the 2012 MLB Draft including first round draftee Travis Jankowski. Matt Senk was announced to be the 2012 National Coach of Year.

Joe Nathan is the only Stony Brook baseball player to have his number retired (No. 22). Joe Nathan Field was named after him in honor of his $500,000 donation. Multiple Seawolves have gone on to play in the MLB, including Nathan, Jankowski, Tom Koehler, Nick Tropeano and Daniel Zamora.

=== Women's lacrosse ===
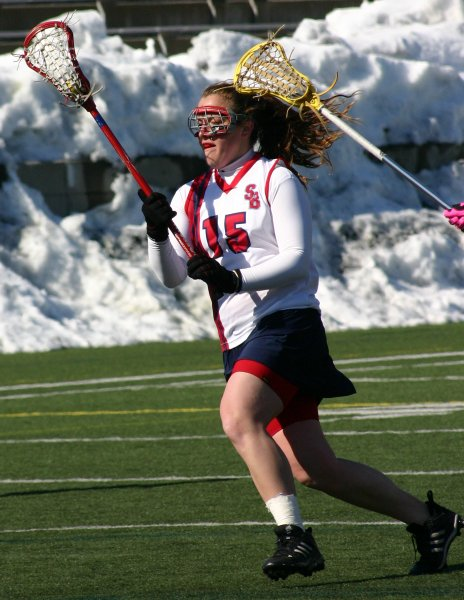
A Stony Brook women's lacrosse player during a game in 2005

The Stony Brook's women's lacrosse team began play in 2003 and won their first America East regular season title in 2007 under head coach Allison Comito. After failing to win more than four games in three straight seasons, Comito was let go in 2011. Joe Spallina, the program's third head coach in team history, was hired in 2012 and the Seawolves saw instant improvements, advancing all the way to the America East Championship, where they fell to Albany. Petersen was named the America East Player of the Year, as well as Stony Brook's first ever All-American.

In the 2013 season, Stony Brook entered the year ranked in the preseason polls for the first time ever in school history. The Seawolves continued their success during the season. Following a win over Albany, Stony Brook was ranked 13th in both top national polls. Undefeated in conference play and the America East playoffs, the Seawolves advanced to the NCAA tournament, defeating Towson in the first round, but losing in the second round to Maryland. Stony Brook finished the season with a 17–3 record and ranked No. 12 in the nation. The season began a string of eight straight where Stony Brook would win the America East regular season and conference championships.

In 2017, Kylie Ohlmiller set the all-time NCAA single-season record for points (164) and assists (86). Ohlmiller would end her career as the NCAA all-time leader in career points (498) and assists (246). Her teammate Courtney Murphy set the all-time NCAA single-season record for goals with 100 in 2016, and Murphy broke the NCAA record for career goals in 2018 with 341.

The Seawolves are 159–30 in ten seasons under Spallina, who has brought Stony Brook to eight straight NCAA tournaments and NCAA quarterfinal appearances in 2017, 2018 and 2021. The 2018 team finished the regular season undefeated before losing in the quarterfinals to Boston College to end their season at 20–1. The team had been ranked No. 1 for the majority of the season in all of the major lacrosse polls.

=== Men's lacrosse ===
Stony Brook first fielded a lacrosse program at the NCAA level in 1983. The team began play at the Division I level in 1988 with new head coach John Espey and earned full funding starting in 1998. Stony Brook was one of six founding members of the ECAC Lacrosse League but left for the America East Conference in 2002 and the CAA in 2022.

In their first season in the America East, Stony Brook finished 10–7 (3–2), and won the conference tournament with an 8–6 win over the Albany Great Danes to advance to the NCAA tournament in their first year, where they lost 12–3 to Cornell in the first round. Espey's head coaching tenure ended in 2004 after 16 years, and Stony Brook hired Penn State assistant Lars Tiffany to take his place. The Seawolves lost in the America East playoffs to Albany in the finals in 2005 and the semifinals in 2006. Tiffany left his position to coach at Brown, and Rick Sowell took over his position.

In 2010, the Seawolves finished the season with a 13–4 record, and an undefeated 5–0 in the America East for the first time. Stony Brook won the America East Championship and advanced to the NCAA tournament for the second time. As the No. 8 seed, the Seawolves beat Denver 9–7 in the first round to advance to the quarterfinals for the first time, where they fell 10–9 to No. 1 seed Virginia at LaValle Stadium in front of a record-setting crowd of 10,024.

Stony Brook entered the 2011 season ranked No. 5 in the USILA Coaches Poll in the preseason and won the America East regular season for the second straight year. Jordan McBride and Rick Sowell were awarded the America East conference Player of the Year and Coach of the Year, respectively. The Seawolves advanced to their third straight America East Championship, losing 11–10 to Hartford and failing to qualify for an NCAA Tournament at-large bid. Sowell resigned as head coach following the season to accept the same position at Navy.

Former Colgate head coach Jim Nagle succeeded Sowell. In Sowell's first year, the Seawolves captured their fourth consecutive regular season championship and defeated Albany in the conference finals to advance to their third NCAA Tournament, where they lost to Johns Hopkins, 19–9, in the first round. Nagle was named America East Coach of the Year. Nagle would not win a conference regular season title until 2018, tying with Albany for first, and again in 2019, when Stony Brook won first place outright and hosted the America East Tournament as the No. 1 seed. However, after being upset by below–.500 UMBC in the semifinals, Nagle was let go by the program after compiling a 68–59 record in eight seasons as head coach.

Towson associate head coach Anthony Gilardi was hired before the 2020 season.

=== Men's soccer ===
After years of little success, Stony Brook turned around the program and won their first regular season championship in 2005. Led by second-year head coach Cesar Markovic, the Seawolves ended the regular season 11–4–3 (6–1–1 America East) and beat Binghamton in the conference championship game via penalty kicks to earn their first berth to the NCAA College Cup. In the first round, Stony Brook defeated Yale on the road 2–1 in OT and lost to UConn 2–0 in the second round. The Seawolves returned to the NCAA College Cup in 2009 by upsetting UMBC in the conference championship, but lost to Brown 1–0 in double OT to end their season at 6–10–4.

Markovic resigned before the 2011 season to become the head coach at NJIT. Led by first-year head coach Ryan Anatol, formerly an assistant at South Florida, Stony Brook clinched its third trip to the NCAA College Cup by beating Hartford in the America East title match. Stony Brook lost in the first round to Monmouth in penalty kicks to end the season at 10–6–4.

Alumni Mike Palacio, Chris Megaloudis, Leo Fernandes and Stephen Turnbull have made Major League Soccer rosters. Fernandes played in 32 matches for the Philadelphia Union, scoring two goals.

=== Women's soccer ===
For much of the program's history, the Stony Brook women's soccer team was led by head coach Sue Ryan, who was also a professor at the university's School of Professional Development. Ryan won 229 matches in 31 years as Stony Brook's head coach and led the Seawolves to their first ever NCAA Women's College Cup appearance in 2012, when Stony Brook beat Hartford 1–0 in the America East Championship. The Seawolves lost 2–0 to No. 9 Maryland, a four seed, in the first round by giving up two goals in the final six minutes, but Stony Brook ended the season with a 12–7–3 record.

Ryan was fired after the 2015 season and replaced by Washington Huskies assistant coach Brendan Faherty. Faherty led the Seawolves to their second NCAA Tournament in 2017 after topping Vermont 2–1 in the conference title match. They lost 7–0 to No. 10 Penn State, the three seed, in the first round. Stony Brook won the conference regular season title in 2018 but lost in the semifinals and Faherty resigned in December to accept the head coach job at Yale.

Hofstra associate head coach Tobias Bischof was named Stony Brook's third head coach. In his first year, Stony Brook beat Hartford 2–1 in the America East championship to reach the NCAA tournament for the third time. Stony Brook led 1–0 at halftime against Penn State in the first round after scoring the program's first NCAA Tournament goal, but lost 3–1. Stony Brook repeated as America East champions in the 2020 season by beating Binghamton 1–0 in the title match, reaching the NCAA tournament for the fourth time and the third time in four seasons. The Seawolves lost 5–1 to Ohio State in the first round.

== Men’s Squash (1966–1994) ==
The Stony Brook men's squash program was established in 1966 by Bob Snider, who served as the team's coach. Snider constructed the university's first squash court by hand in a campus basement to demonstrate interest in the sport and persuade the administration to support a formal team. The program operated as a varsity sport for nearly three decades.

The program quickly proved its worth on the national stage. During the 1972-73 season, the University achieved a historic milestone when Stu Goldstein became Stony Brook's first All-American athlete in any sport. Goldstein's success would extend far beyond college, as he went on to become the world #1 in professional squash after graduation. The program continued to produce elite talent with two additional All Americans: Neil Vohr (class of 1981) and Robert Bruno (class of 1988). The team's competitive excellence was consistently recognized nationally, with the 1978-79 team earning a 6th place ranking in the country. Over the program's history, Stony Brook squash was ranked in the top ten nationally four times, with their final top ten appearance coming in the 1985-86 season.

In the early 1990s, the University built a new field house with new courts. These courts would ultimately spell the downfall of the program. The university invested in hardball squash courts during a period when most American colleges were transitioning to the international softball format. This left Stony Brook's facilities outdated and reduced the number of available opponents playing hardball squash. Without plans to convert to softball courts, the program lost administrative support and was discontinued in 1994.

== Facilities ==
The Seawolves facilities are all located on the west campus at Stony Brook. The university is currently improving many of their facilities through funding by grants and donations of alumni to be completed in the upcoming years. The main facilities are:

- Kenneth P. LaValle Stadium: built in 2002, expanded in 2017, the stadium serves as the home of the football, men's and women's soccer and lacrosse teams with a capacity of 12,300 people (10,300 seating and 2,000 standing).
- Stony Brook Sports Complex: the main complex that houses offices and several athletic facilities.

- Island Federal Credit Union Arena: the 4,000 seat arena serves as the home of the men's and women's basketball teams, which opened in the fall of 2014 after extensive renovations. It also functions as an entertainment center.
- Pritchard Gymnasium: built in the early 1960s, the 1,630-seat gymnasium is currently the home of the volleyball team.
- Dubin Family Athletic Performance Center: the 8,000-square foot performance center began construction in mid-2011 and was completed with a ribbon cutting ceremony on June 6, 2012. The facility was named after the Dubin Family who donated $4.3 million for the construction of the project, the largest private athletic donation in the SUNY system.
- Stony Brook Swimming Pool: home to the Seawolves men's and women's swimming and diving teams. It contains bleacher seating for 250 spectators, and a 25-yard length pool.

- Joe Nathan Field: home to the Seawolves baseball team. It recently underwent major renovation after a $500,000 donation from major league pitcher and Stony Brook alumnus Joe Nathan. It is a 1,000-seat facility with a FieldTurf surface.
- University Track: the track serves as the home of the Seawolves outdoor men's and women's track & field teams, and includes a field in the center used as a practice facility.

== Championships ==
Sport	Regular Season Conference Championships	Conference Tournament Championships
Baseball	2011, 2012, 2014, 2015, 2019, 2021, 2022°	2004, 2008, 2010, 2012, 2015, 2019
Men's Basketball	2010, 2012, 2013, 2016	2016
Women's Basketball	2020, 2024	2020, 2021
Football	2005°, 2009°, 2010°, 2011, 2012	N/A – No conference tournaments for Football
Men's Lacrosse	2009, 2010, 2011, 2012, 2018°, 2019	2002, 2010, 2012
Women's Lacrosse	2007, 2013, 2014, 2015, 2016, 2017, 2018, 2019, 2021, 2022, 2023, 2024	2013, 2014, 2015, 2016, 2017, 2018, 2019, 2021, 2023, 2024
Men's Soccer	2005, 2018	2005, 2009, 2011
Women's Soccer	2018°, 2019°, 2024°	2012, 2017, 2019, 2020, 2024
Softball	2014	2008, 2013
Men's Cross Country		2012, 2016, 2017, 2019, 2022, 2023, 2024
Women's Cross Country		2007, 2008, 2009, 2010, 2011, 2012
Men's Tennis		2006
Women's Tennis		2012, 2013, 2014
Women's Volleyball	2007, 2018	2017, 2018

° – Signifies Co-Champions

In March 2012, Lucy Van Dalen became Stony Brook's first NCAA individual National Champion after winning the mile at the NCAA Indoor Track championship.

== Rivalries ==
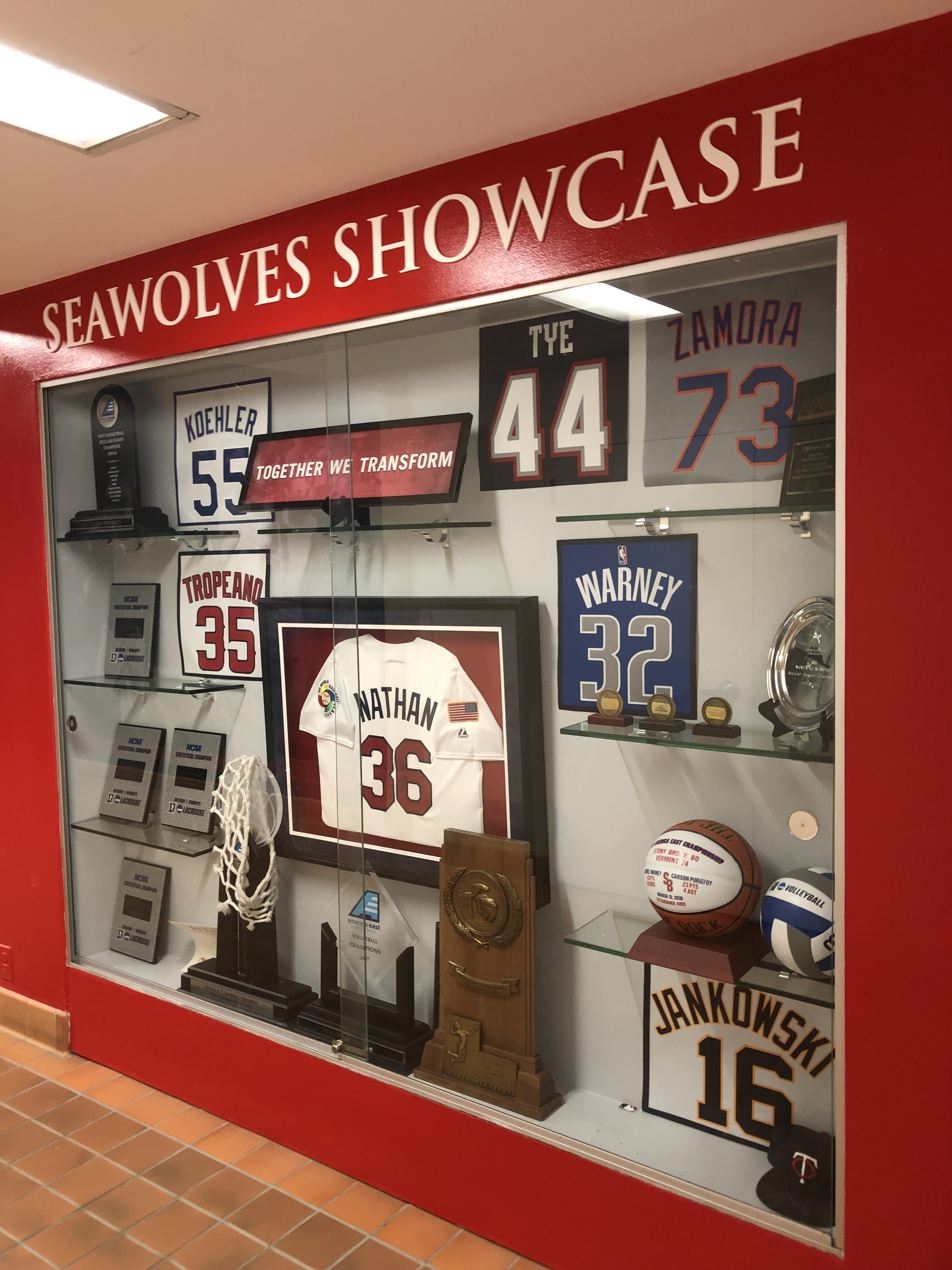
Seawolves Showcase of notable alumni and championship trophies

=== Albany Great Danes ===
Albany is Stony Brook's in-state rival, as both universities are part of the State University of New York system. Before Stony Brook joined the all-sports CAA, both schools were members of the America East Conference, which remains home to UAlbany. Both football teams have been members of CAA Football since 2013. Since both schools joined CAA Football, the Albany–Stony Brook annual football game has become known as the Empire Clash. Since 2015, the winner of the Empire Clash has been awarded the Golden Apple trophy.

In men's basketball, Albany defeated Stony Brook in two consecutive America East Finals games, first in 2014 and then in 2015 to deny the Seawolves the conference's automatic bid to the NCAA tournament. While Stony Brook has won four America East regular season titles compared to Albany's two, Albany has won five America East Tournament titles (and NCAA berths) compared to Stony Brook's one.

Stony Brook and Albany have met five times in the America East Men's Lacrosse Championship game (2002, 2005, 2010, 2012, 2015). Stony Brook has won three of these matches. Stony Brook defeated Albany 12–10 in 2019 to clinch the conference regular season title and snap a ten-game losing streak against Albany. In women's lacrosse, Stony Brook and Albany have met in eight consecutive America East title games. After Albany won in 2012, Stony Brook won seven straight conference championships against the Great Danes.

=== Hofstra Pride ===
The rivalry between the Seawolves and the Hofstra Pride is known as the Battle of Long Island. The two schools represent the only Division I programs to be completely based on Long Island, with Stony Brook representing Suffolk County and Hofstra representing Nassau County. (Note: A third Division I program, LIU, houses some sports on its Post campus in Nassau County and others at its Brooklyn campus. Although Brooklyn is geographically on Long Island, the local definition of "Long Island" includes only Nassau and Suffolk Counties.) Historically, this rivalry has been dominated by Hofstra. As Hofstra closed their football program after the 2009 season, the rivalry was temporarily postponed due to a decision by the Pride. The rivalry was resumed in 2014 after a six-year break.

== Club sports ==
Stony Brook University also participates in competitive athletics through various leagues, associations, and unions not associated with the NCAA. Although not affiliated with the Athletics Department, these clubs fall under the purview of Campus Recreation. With over 25 men's, women's and co-ed teams, the sports clubs have embraced the new Seawolves mascot and compete across the United States and around the world.

Some of the larger and more well established programs are:

- Stony Brook Ice Hockey
- Stony Brook Roller Hockey
- Stony Brook Crew Team
- Stony Brook Men's Rugby
- Stony Brook Soccer Club
- Stony Brook Club Swimming
- Stony Brook Running Club
- Stony Brook Sailing

In addition to the opportunities that Sports Clubs provide, the success of the program depends heavily upon the student leaders of each individual club. These student leaders handle administrative decisions regarding their club.

=== Ice hockey ===
The Seawolves Men's ice hockey team plays its home games at the Rinx in Hauppauge, NY. The Seawolves are a member of the ESCHL league, affiliated with the ACHA, in the Division I level.

=== Rugby ===
Founded in 1980, Stony Brook plays college rugby in the Empire Conference in Division I-AA. The Stony Brook Men's Rugby team is the first recorded athletic team to represent the Seawolves overseas, playing some of the toughest European competition against various Irish teams. Seawolves rugby won the Empire Conference in 2013 and again in 2014, and were ranked in the top 25 nationally in 2014. Stony Brook rugby has been led by head coach Jerry Mirro since 2013.

== History, name and mascot ==
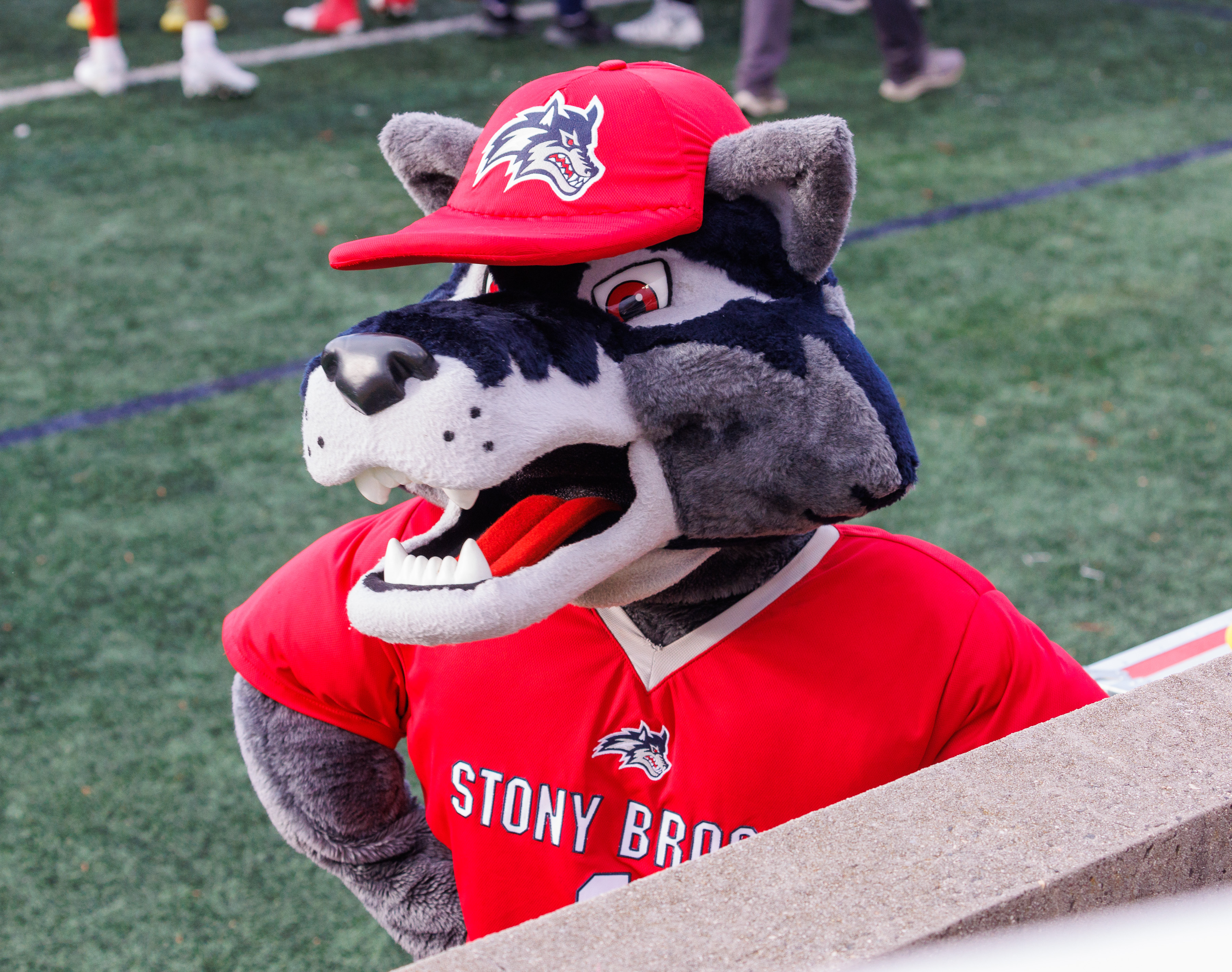
Wolfie the Seawolf

The university began in 1957 at Oyster Bay, with the teams known as the Soundmen/Baymen. The campus moved to its present location in 1962, and from 1960 to 1966, the programs competed as the Warriors. Beginning in 1966, the Stony Brook athletic teams were known as the Stony Brook Patriots. In 1994, as Stony Brook anticipated a rise to Division I in the NCAA, the nickname of the team was changed to the Seawolves.

The Seawolves nickname is based on a mythical creature called the Sea-wolf or Gonakadet. The Seawolf was said to be a mythical creature from the Tlingit tribe which brought good luck to those able to see it. The creature was inspired by real life pescatarian Sea wolves, which are found in the Great Bear Rainforest and in the northern Vancouver Island within the Pacific Northwest Coast of North America.

Wolfie is the mascot for the Stony Brook Seawolves. He was first seen in 1995 after being selected out of 200 possible choices by a committee of multiple university members. He has appeared on multiple ESPN promotions and public events in New York City and Long Island.

== Fans and traditions ==
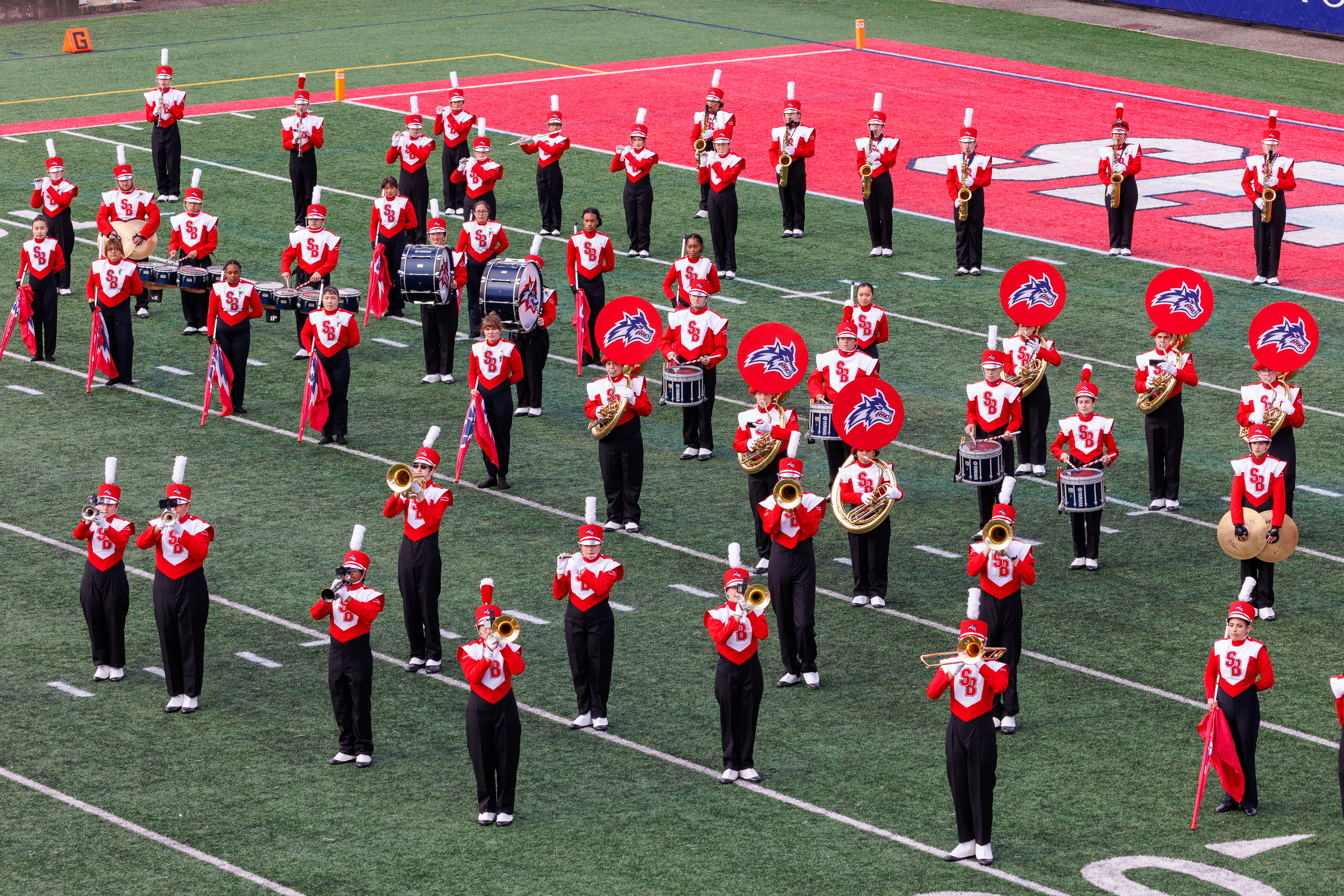
The Spirit of Stony Brook marching band

The student section at Stony Brook is known as The Red Zone. Red is the official color of Stony Brook Seawolves, and the fans at the section would be wearing red. The fans in the section known as the most spirited group of students in the university. They promote school spirit across the rest of the school. Students are admitted to games for free. More than a section, the Red Zone is also an undergraduate group devoted towards promoting school spirit and athletic events. They often participate in "dorm storming", increasing awareness of events by knocking on dorms across campus.

When students are asked "What's a Seawolf?", students will chant the response "I'm a Seawolf!" The chant was created by Jerrold Stein, the university's Associate Vice President of Student Affairs.

The following are the Alma Mater, fight song and the athletic chant of "Go...Fight...Win!" played at the athletic events by The Spirit of Stony Brook marching band.

Stony Brook's Alma Mater, Sandy Shore, was adopted in 1985 after a composition contest. Peter Winkler, a professor in the Department of Music, in conjunction with lyricist Winston Clark, wrote the winning submission. Carol Marburger, the wife of former University President John Marburger, is credited as the guiding spirit of the song.
