= Stony Brook University Track =

Track/field at Stony Brook University

Coordinates: 40.920136°N 73.126364°W

The Stony Brook University Track is the track/field at Stony Brook University serving as the home of the Stony Brook Seawolves men's and women's Track & Field Division I program. The Track and Field is located in the west campus and limited to the east by the Kenneth P. LaValle Stadium, to the west by Circle Road, to the south by Stony Brook Sports Complex and the recreational basketball and handball courts, and limited to the north by the intramural baseball and soccer fields.

== Renovations ==
Stony Brook University completely reconstructed the university track, at a cost of US$3 million in a new state-of-the-art track & field and FieldTurf practice facility. The reconstruction was completed in July 2011 and now will serve as the new practice facility for the Seawolves football, Men's and Women's lacrosse, and the soccer programs.

The new track was designed by Clough, Harbor and Associates (CHA) and Paige Design Group, and built by the LandTek Group.

=== Specifications ===
The eight-lane track oval is made of a full-pour Mondo polyurethane surface 13 millimeters thick and has eight 42" inch lanes on the oval and both straight-a-ways, as well as two sprint chutes. The oval also includes space for the steeplechase.

The infield of the track has the same FieldTurf surface that is used at LaValle Stadium. The 225'x 360' field helps alleviate the practice schedule needs for Stony Brook's men's & women's lacrosse, men's & women's soccer and football teams, who all currently use LaValle Stadium for both practice and game competition.

== Long Jump, Triple Jump, Pole Vault and High Jump ==
In addition to the new track and field, the facility also contains specialized areas for the field events. Adjacent to the oval are pits and runways for the long jump, triple jump and pole vault events. Next to the oval within the infield there is an area for the high jump. On the east side of the facility is a throwing area complete with separate spots for the shot put, hammer/discus and javelin.
