= All the Way (Timeflies song) =

Single by Timeflies

from the album After Hours
- Released: January 20, 2014
- Genre: Pop
- Length: 2:59
- Label: Island
- Songwriters: Rob Resnick; Cal Shapiro
- Producers: Rob Resnick; Cal Shapiro; SoFly and Nius

Timeflies singles chronology
"Ride" (2013)	"All the Way" (2014)	"Monsters" (2014)

"All the Way" is a song recorded by American band Timeflies for their second studio album, After Hours (2014). It was released as the record's fourth single on January 20, 2014 as a digital download. A CD single and remix EP would later be released 8 days later through Island Records. The track was written and produced by Rob Resnick and Cal Shapiro, with SoFly and Nius also contributing to the production. An upbeat pop song with synths, "All the Way" encourages its listeners to succeed and always do their best.

"All the Way" was praised by music critics for being catchy. Commercially, the song charted in both Sweden and the United States. It also spent 23 non-consecutive weeks on the Hot Dance/Electronic Songs. A lyric video with skateboarders was released on February 4, 2014 before the premiere of the music video two weeks later.

== Background and composition ==
While writing music for After Hours, Rob Resnick and Cal Shapiro focused on writing dance, and pop music songs with influence from R&B music. "All the Way" served as the fourth single from After Hours, following "Swoon", "I Choose U" and "Ride", which were all released in 2013. The song was first released on January 20, 2014 as a paid digital download in the United States. Eight days later, an extended play (EP) featuring four remixes created by Chuckie and Laidback Luke was distributed by Island Records. A CD single with the same tracks as the EP plus the original version of "All the Way" was also released.

"All the Way" is an upbeat pop song, that has a duration of two minutes and 59 seconds. The track was written and produced by Rob Resnick and Cal Shapiro, with SoFly and Nius also contributing to the production. Prior to working with SoFly and Nius, Timeflies claimed that it was the first time they had worked with collaborators. In terms of the music itself, the song predominantly features a "sugary sweet pop production" with "soaring synths". With empowering lyrics, it encourages individuals to take pride in whatever task they are faced.

== Reception ==
"All the Way" was described by MTV News's Jenna Hally Rubenstein as one of "the catchiest pop jam[s]" that she has ever heard, comparing it to the works of Capital Cities, Zedd, and Cash Cash. Equally positive was Kristin Harris from Seventeen, who called it awesome and warned that listeners of the song may leave it "on repeat for about 5 hours" because it is catchy. Stephanie Ironson, an editor for Elite Daily, wrote an article about Timeflies appearing at the "Billboard Hot 100 Fest" in August 2016 and referred to "All the Way" as her favorite song by the group. Agreeing, AndPop's Kalyna Taras found that "after only a couple listens", any individual will be "singing along" and "tapping [their] feet". A writer for The Quinnipiac Chronicle described the success of "All the Way", stating that because it is "constantly on pop radio stations, [they are] solidifying [their] place in the music industry".

In the United States, "All the Way" spent one week at number nine on Billboard's Bubbling Under Hot 100 Singles chart. The song's digital sales allowed it to enter the Pop Digital Songs and Heatseeker Songs component charts, where it peaked at numbers 23 and 20, respectively. In that same country, "All the Way" found success on the Hot Dance/Electronic Songs, where it remained for 23 non-consecutive weeks and peaked at number 11. On the Dance Club Songs chart, it spent 9 weeks charting before peaking at number 28 on May 3, 2014. It also ranked on Sweden's Sverigetopplistan chart, where it peaked at number 42 over the course of a four weeks.

== Promotion ==
During a January 2014 interview with Seventeen, Timeflies hinted that a music video for "All the Way" would be filmed in the near future. Instead, a lyric video featuring professional skateboarders was released on February 4, 2014 instead. The music video premiered on February 18 through Timeflies' official Vevo account. It includes several extras doing various activities like snowboarding, surfing, and riding dune buggies; other scenes are shown with artists doing graffiti. It is interspersed with clips of Timeflies performing the song. During an interview with Hollywood Life immediately after the video's filming, they claimed that the skateboarder in the visual had broken his helmet while performing stunts.

At the first annual Billboard Hot 100 Fest in August 2016, Timeflies performed several songs from their catalog during the set list. During their time on stage, they opened with "All the Way" before yelling at their fans: "Are y'all ready to party with us?".

== Track listings and formats ==
Digital download

1. "All the Way" – 2:59

Remixes EP

1. "All the Way (Chuckie Club)" – 3:48
2. "All the Way (Chuckie Radio Edit)" – 3:18
3. "All the Way (Laidback Luke Bounce Club)" – 5:39
4. "All the Way (Laidback Luke Bounce Radio Edit)" – 3:29

CD single

1. "All the Way (Chuckie Club)" – 3:48
2. "All the Way (Chuckie Radio Edit)" – 3:18
3. "All the Way (Laidback Luke Bounce Club)" – 5:39
4. "All the Way (Laidback Luke Bounce Radio Edit)" – 3:29
5. "All the Way" – 2:59

== Charts ==
=== Weekly charts ===
Chart (2014)	Peak position
Sweden (Sverigetopplistan)	42
US Bubbling Under Hot 100 (Billboard)	9
US Dance Club Songs (Billboard)	28
US Hot Dance/Electronic Songs (Billboard)	11
US Pop Digital Songs (Billboard)	23

=== Year-end charts ===
Chart (2014)	Position
US Hot Dance/Electronic Songs (Billboard)	47

== Certifications ==
Region	Certification	Certified units/sales
Sweden (GLF)	Gold	20,000^{‡}
^{‡} Sales+streaming figures based on certification alone.
