= Wolfie the Seawolf =

Stony Brook University sports mascot

Wolfie Seawolf
- Wolfie Seawolf
- Team: Stony Brook Seawolves
- University: Stony Brook University
- Conference: Coastal Athletic Association
- Description: Anthropomorphic sea wolf
- Origin of name: Winning entry in competition
- First seen: 1995
- Related mascot(s): Scout (Stony Brook Children's)

Wolfie Seawolf is the mascot of the Stony Brook Seawolves, the athletic teams representing Stony Brook University, one of four public flagship universities in New York state. Wolfie is depicted as an anthropomorphic sea wolf and was introduced in 1995 as the Stony Brook athletic program began its transition to the NCAA's Division I level, the highest in United States collegiate athletics.

== History ==
=== Background ===
In the 1950s, Stony Brook athletic teams were known as the Soundsmen, named for the campus's then-location in Oyster Bay, New York. After moving to Stony Brook, the teams competed as the Warriors from 1963 to 1966. Since 1966, Stony Brook competed as the Stony Brook Patriots at the Division III level.

=== Origin ===
In 1994, Stony Brook University sought a new team name and mascot for its transition to Division I. The name "Seawolves" was chosen over 200 candidates by a 32-person committee made up of students, alumni, faculty and administrators. The following year, Wolfie the Seawolf mascot was created.

=== Design ===
The design for Wolfie's costume evolved over the years. The initial costume was thought to be "too intimidating" to children, and was replaced with a more cartoonish design. In 2006, the Wolfie design was changed again in an attempt to appear more "professional." Wolfie has a wardrobe of different outfits for different occasions, including pajamas, a lab coat, a tuxedo, and various hats and pants.

== Appearances in media ==
In 2005, Wolfie beat up J.J. Jumper, the NCAA's official basketball mascot, during an America East tournament game.

Wolfie met Al Roker, a weatherman on NBC's Today show, during a live segment in 2008. Along with the Stony Brook University marching band, dance team and cheerleading team, Wolfie was featured in a 2010 episode of Extreme Makeover: Home Edition which highlighted in a home in East Setauket, New York.

Wolfie was one of 17 college mascots to appear in a 2011 commercial for ESPN's College GameDay. Stony Brook was the only Football Championship Subdivision school represented by its mascot in the commercial.

In 2012, a video of Wolfie dancing to "U Can't Touch This" by MC Hammer was named "Web Video of the Day" by ESPN.

Wolfie marched alongside the Stony Brook baseball team in the 2012 New York City Columbus Day Parade to commemorate the Seawolves' Cinderella run to the College World Series. Since 2014, Wolfie regularly marches with the Stony Brook dance team and marching band in the annual Columbus Day Parade.

On March 15, 2014, Wolfie was involved in a physical fight with Damien the Great Dane, the mascot for the Albany Great Danes, in the first half of the America East Championship game. The well-publicized altercation came as Stony Brook faced its longtime New York rival Albany with a bid to the NCAA Tournament on the line.

In 2020, Ryan Field, an Emmy-winning broadcaster for ABC's Eyewitness News, portrayed Wolfie in a segment.

For two consecutive years in 2022 and 2023, Wolfie won the SUNY Mascot Madness title for Stony Brook. Mascot Madness is the annual competition that brings the State University of New York mascots together in a competition to find out who the fans feel is the best in all of New York.

In January 2024, Wolfie finished fifth in the Open Mascot division at the Universal Cheerleading Association's College Cheer and Dance Team National Championships

On September 26, 2024, a bronze statue of Wolfie was unveiled in the academic mall of Stony Brook's West Campus.

In January 2025, Wolfie finished fifth in the Open Mascot division at the Universal Cheerleading Association's College Cheer and Dance Team National Championships

In January 2026, Wolfie finished second in the Open Mascot division at the Universal Cheerleading Association's College Cheer and Dance Team National Championships

== Lore ==
Wolfie was born on February 10, 1994. He is 7 feet tall and he is a double major in marine biology and cheerleading.

The Seawolf is described as a mythical sea creature from the Tlingit tribe with the head of a wolf and the fins of a killer whale. It supposedly brings good luck to those able to see it. However, the Stony Brook mascot looks like an ordinary wolf.
