= After Hours (Timeflies album) =

Studio album by Timeflies
- Released: April 29, 2014
- Recorded: 2012–13
- Genre: Pop, hip hop, electronic, dance
- Length: 47:06
- Label: Island Records
- Producer: Timeflies

Timeflies chronology
The Scotch Tape (2011)	After Hours (2014)	Just for Fun (2015)

Singles from After Hours
- 1. "Swoon" Released: February 15, 2013; 2. "I Choose U" Released: April 2, 2013; 3. "Ride" Released: October 8, 2013; 4. "All the Way" Released: January 21, 2014; 5. "Monsters" Released: April 15, 2014

After Hours is the second studio album by the American pop band, Timeflies, released through Island Records on April 29, 2014.

== Background ==
The recording of the album took place between 2012 and 2013 in their home studio in New York City.

== Chart performance ==
On the issue dated May 17, 2014, After Hours debuted at number 8 on the US Billboard 200, selling 20,000 copies in its first week. The album has sold 36,000 copies in the US as of August 2015.

== Track listing ==
No.	Title	Length
1.	"Start It Up Again"	3:15
2.	"All We Got is Time"	3:35
3.	"Somebody 'Gon Get It (feat. T-Pain)"	3:32
4.	"Crystal Ball"	3:00
5.	"Fall (feat. Fabolous)"	3:07
6.	"All the Way"	2:59
7.	"Swoon"	3:19
8.	"Monsters (feat. Katie Sky)"	3:45
9.	"Beast"	3:14
10.	"I Choose U"	3:47
11.	"Yeah"	2:37
12.	"Amy (Bonus Track)"	3:13
13.	"Ride (Bonus Track)"	3:03
14.	"Alkaline (Bonus Track)"	4:12

== Weekly charts ==
Chart (2014)	Peak position
US Billboard 200	8
