= Just for Fun (Timeflies album) =

Studio album by Timeflies
- Released: September 18, 2015
- Recorded: 2014–15
- Genre: Pop Rap; dance-pop
- Label: Island Records
- Producer: Timeflies

Timeflies chronology
After Hours (2014)	Just for Fun (2015)

Singles from Just for Fun
- 1. "Worse Things Than Love" Released: June 23, 2015; 2. "Guilty" Released: September 1, 2015; 3. "Crazy" Released: September 15, 2015

Just for Fun is the third studio album and second major label album by American pop band Timeflies. It was released on September 18, 2015 through Island Records. A buzz single for the album, "NSFW" (featuring Angel Haze), was released in February 2015, but the song was cut from the album's final track list. It was followed by the album's official lead single "Worse Things Than Love" (featuring Natalie La Rose) on June 23, 2015. Prior to the album's release, "Undress Rehearsal" and "Stuck with Me" were released as promotional singles. "Guilty" was released as the album's second single with its music video premiering on 1 September 2015; "Crazy" was the third single and its video debuted on September 15. Timeflies promoted the album with The Just for Fun Tour, running from October to November 2015.

== Track listing ==
Just for Fun – standard edition
No.	Title	Writer(s)	Length
1.	"Jump and Shake"		3:09
2.	"Undress Rehearsal"	Rob Resnick; Cal Shapiro; James 'JHart' Abrahart	3:34
3.	"Prosecco"	Shane Lee Evans; Resnick; Shapiro	3:25
4.	"Worse Things than Love" (featuring Natalie La Rose)	Rob Resnick; Cal Shapiro; Jonas Jeberg; Talay Riley; Christian Walz	3:19
5.	"Crazy"		3:07
6.	"Guilty"	Rob Resnick; Cal Shapiro; Teddy Geiger; Daniel Kyriakides	2:43
7.	"Burn It Down"		3:25
8.	"Insomniac"		2:59
9.	"Time Machine"	Shane Lee Evans	3:31
10.	"Last Night"		2:54
11.	"Stuck with Me"	Rob Resnick; Cal Shapiro; Jon Bellion	2:52

Just for Fun – deluxe edition
No.	Title	Length
12.	"Booty Call"	3:05
13.	"No Excuses"	2:49
14.	"Runaway" (featuring Carly Rose Sonenclar)	3:29

== Charts ==
Chart (2015)	Peak position
US Billboard 200	61
