= Timeflies =

American pop music duo

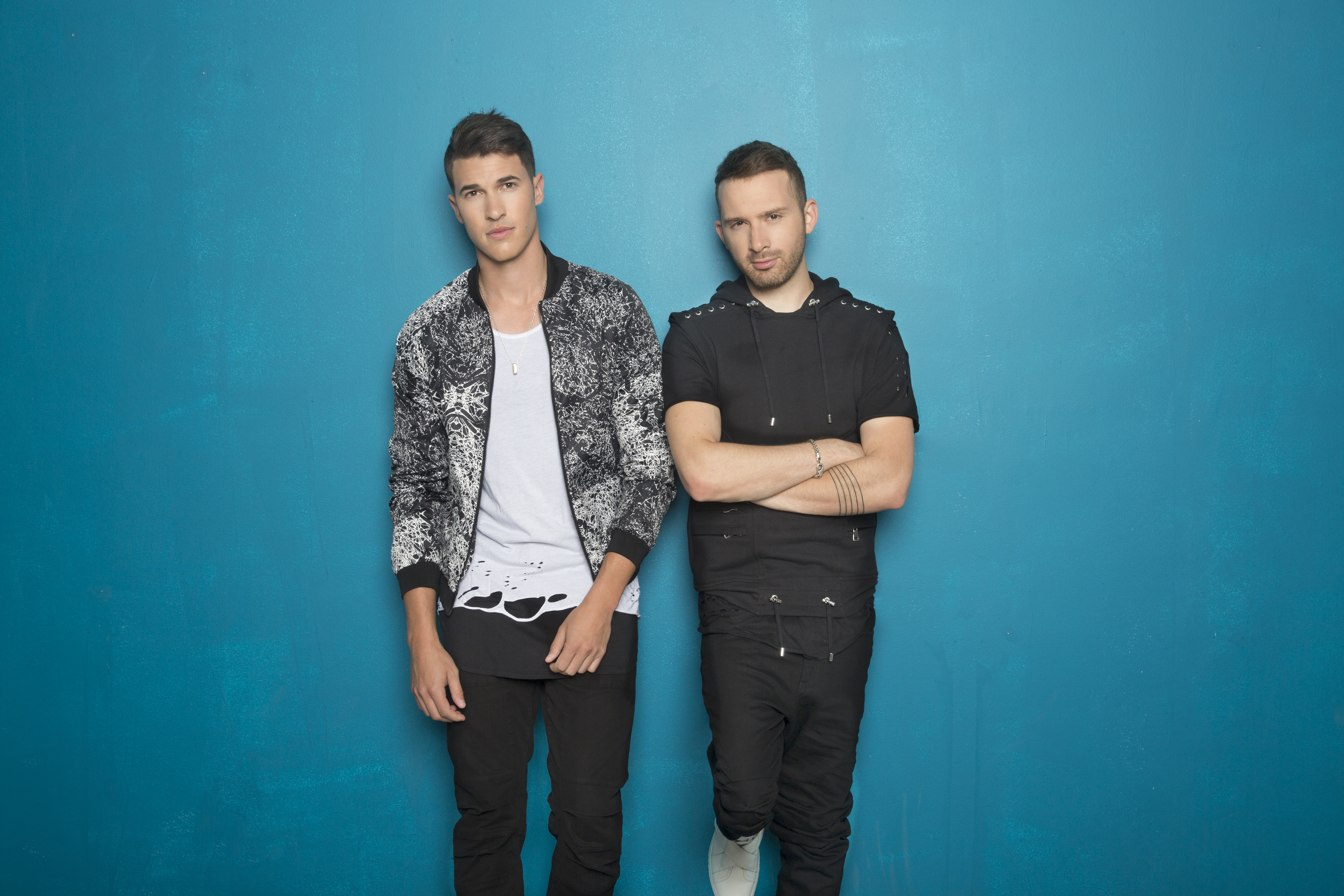
- Timeflies band Cal Shapiro (left) and Rob Resnick (right)

Background information
- Origin: Boston, Massachusetts, United States
- Genres: Pop, hip hop, pop-rap, electronic, dance
- Years active: 2010–present
- Labels: Forty8Fifty, Epic, Island
- Members: Cal Shapiro; Rob Resnick

Timeflies is an American pop-rap duo formed in October 2010 consisting of Cal Shapiro (b. October 3, 1988) and Rob Resnick (b. May 26, 1989). They are known for their popular original music and popular YouTube covers. They first performed together as 'The Ride' in collaboration with writer Matt Merritt while in college at Tufts University.

Since 2010, the band has built a diehard following, amassing fan growth online while selling out concert venues across the United States. To date, Timeflies has sold over 150,000 albums and 800,000 singles, combined with 175 million video views and 261 million Spotify streams worldwide.

Their vast fanbase started with the weekly tradition “Timeflies Tuesday” on YouTube where they would showcase new music. Now, the weekly program has grown into a phenomenon exceeding 145 million views.

Following indie breakout The Scotch Tape in 2011, their 2014 first major label offering, After Hours, debuted at #8 on the Billboard Top 200, went #1 on the iTunes Top Pop Albums chart, and yielded the hit “All the Way” which soared to #2 on Billboard’s Top Digital Songs chart and has earned over 50 million Spotify streams. More recently, they released Just for Fun before headlining the 35-city Just for Fun Tour. They have landed high-profile music placements in films like About Last Night and My Big Fat Greek Wedding 2 and from MLB, NBC, Red Bull, American Idol, and more. Having hit the stage at Good Morning America and on Jimmy Kimmel LIVE!, Timeflies has been dubbed "Musical Masterminds" by Vanity Fair.

== History ==
Shapiro and Resnick are originally from New York and New Jersey, respectively, but began to perform for the first time in Boston in 2007. The two currently reside in Los Angeles, after recently moving from New York. Timeflies includes elements of hip-hop, pop, electro, R&B, and rap in their music.

Attending Tufts University, the pair met in fall 2007 at a college party where Shapiro freestyled over Resnick's beat boxing. Resnick later invited Shapiro to be the singer for The Ride, a funk band he was part of. "The Ride" dissolved after some members graduated but Resnick and Shapiro started recording together in the spring semester of their senior year. Eventually calling themselves Timeflies, the duo posted songs to an increasingly popular YouTube account in which Shapiro did vocals over beats Resnick produced. The group's exposure increased when Shapiro's housemate Jared Glick, now the general manager of Timeflies, sent their song "Fade" to various music blogs.

In late September 2011, Timeflies released their debut album, The Scotch Tape, which rose to #8 on the iTunes overall chart and #2 on the iTunes Pop chart within 24 hours of its release. Shapiro and Resnick were dubbed “musical masterminds” by Vanity Fair. That same year, they began to perform college campuses and music festivals across the United States.

On August 14, 2012, Timeflies released their official application to the Apple App Store produced by the development team of Matthew Hamilton and Graham Tomlinson.

On November 27, 2012, they released their first EP, One Night. Within 24 hours of its release, One Night reached #2 on the overall iTunes chart and was #1 on the iTunes Pop chart. The EP debuted on the Billboard 200 at #29. The title track from the EP climbed to #84 on the iTunes Pop charts and "Swoon" debuted and peaked on the Billboard Rap Digital Songs at #45. Billboard named them one of their 13 artists to watch for in 2013.

On February 22, 2013, they announced that they had created their own label, Forty8Fifty. The label is partnered with Island Def Jam Music Group. Their next full-length album will be out later in 2013 and will be released on the label.

Their debut single, "I Choose U", was released on April 1, 2013 to digital retailers and was released to American radio under Island Def Jam Music Group. The single was remixed by Fedde Le Grand and on June 3 released on his official SoundCloud page. The song received as many listens in three days as Le Grand's single "Rockin' N' Rollin'" acquired in one month.

On August 2, 2013, they performed at the Lollapalooza music festival in Chicago.

Their second EP, Warning Signs, featuring the hit single "I Choose U", was released on October 13, 2013.

Timeflies released their debut album, After Hours on April 29, 2014 under their own label Forty8Fifty and Island Def Jam Music Group. The album includes features from Fabolous, T-Pain, and Katie Sky, as well as collaborations with Mike Posner and Martin Johnson, the lead vocalist of Boys Like Girls. The duo spent well over a year recording the album in a home studio in Los Angeles. The album reached #3 on the overall iTunes charts and #1 on the iTunes pop chart. They released a music video for "Monsters" on April 15, 2014 which has over 1.6 million views on YouTube. The lead single from their third album, "Worse Things Than Love", features Natalie La Rose and was released on June 23, 2015. Their third studio album, Just for Fun was released on September 18, 2015 along with the Just for Fun Tour.

== Timeflies Tuesdays ==
Almost every other Tuesday, Timeflies posts new music to their YouTube channel. Timeflies connects to their fans through Timeflies Tuesdays, which is a series of videos of remixes, performing live covers, and freestyling over original beats. Some Timeflies Tuesday videos include covers and remixes of "Sorry", "Hands to Myself", "Let It Go", "Cruise", "Say Something", "Paranoid", "Pompeii", "Timber", "Alcohol", "We Can't Stop", "Roar", "Call Me Maybe", "Royals", "Under the Sea", "Wagon Wheel", "Sugar" and many more. The duo also posts their original songs and new releases.

== Musical style and influences ==
Rob Resnick had an early start in production after building a Pro Tools studio in his basement for his high school bands, Inevitable and After Tonight. At Tufts, Resnick majored in music and philosophy. During sophomore year, he began using audio production software such as Reason, Digital Performer and Ableton Live. During this time, Resnick was a DJ regularly, and played drums for The Ride, a blues/funk/hip-hop band noted for their ability to cross musical genres. Resnick also worked at Cedar Lake Camp as music director which gave him a good amount of music production experience. He cites Porter Robinson, Benny Blanco, Pretty Lights, and JR Rotem as major influences.

Cal Shapiro has been singing and freestyling since he was a teenager, earning his first public "stripes" beating defending champion Puge in a freestyle battle at Hampshire. He later earned his college degree at Tufts University, majoring in music and entrepreneurship. In his sophomore year, upon joining The Ride, Shapiro fell in love with performing. He later teamed up with The Ride's drummer, Rob Resnick, to form Timeflies. Shapiro's musical influences include Robert Johnson, Janis Joplin, Muddy Waters, and his favorite, Big L. He has become well known for his love for scotch, hence their first album name, The Scotch Tape.

== Discography ==
=== Albums ===
List of extended plays, with selected chart positions
Title	Album details	Peak chart positions				Sales
Title	Album details	US	US Heat	US Rap	US Indie	Sales
The Scotch Tape	Released: September 19, 2011; Label: Unsigned; Format: Digital download	—	4	—	39	
After Hours	Released: April 29, 2014; Label: Island Records; Format: CD, Digital download	8	—	—	—	US: 36,000
Just for Fun	Released: September 18, 2015; Label: Island Records; Format: CD, Digital download	61	—	—	—	
"—" denotes items which were not released in that country or failed to chart.

=== Extended plays ===
List of extended plays, with selected chart positions
Title	Album details	Peak chart positions		
Title	Album details	US	US Digital	US Rap
One Night	Released: November 27, 2012; Label: Island Records; Format: Digital download	29	2	2
Warning Signs	Released: October 14, 2013; Label: Forty8Fifty / Island Records; Format: Digital download	36	—	—

=== Mixtapes ===
- Under the Influence (2012)
- 18th and Nowhere (2017)

=== Singles ===
List of singles, with selected chart positions and certifications, showing year released and album name
Title	Year	Peak chart positions									Certifications	Album
Title	Year	US Bub.	US Dance	AUT	DEN	NLD	NOR	SWE	SWI	UK	Certifications	Album
"I Choose U"	2013	8	6	—	—	—	—	—	—	—		After Hours
"All the Way"	2014	9	48	—	—	—	—	42	—	—	GLF: Gold	After Hours
"Worse Things Than Love" (featuring Natalie La Rose)	2015	—	—	—	—	—	—	—	—	—		Just for Fun
"Once in a While"	2016	7	—	58	32	15	19	23	56	193	RIAA: Platinum; GLF: 2× Platinum; IFPI DEN: Platinum	TBA

=== Remixes ===
Title	Year	Album
"Little Bit" (Feather Remix)	2018	Little Bit (Feather Remix)

== Awards and nominations ==
Year	Ceremony	Nominated work	Category	Result
2013	Popdust	Timeflies	Next Pop Superstar of 2013	Nominated
