= Once in a While (Timeflies song) =

Single by Timeflies
- Released: March 18, 2016
- Genre: Pop; pop-rap; tropical house
- Length: 3:35
- Label: Forty8Fifty; Epic; Sony
- Songwriters: Rob Resnick; Cal Shapiro
- Producer: Timeflies

Timeflies singles chronology
"Worse Things Than Love" (2015)	"Once in a While" (2016)	"Gravity" (2016)

Music video
- "Once in a While" on YouTube

"Once in a While" is a song by American pop duo Timeflies. It was made available for digital download on March 18, 2016, through Forty8Fifty Music Group and Epic Records. The song became a viral hit on Spotify, gathering over 300 million streams. It also reached the top 40 charts in at least 8 countries across Europe, as well as the top 40 of the U.S. Billboard Mainstream Top 40 chart.

== Live performances ==
Timeflies performed "Once in a While" on Good Day L.A. on September 7, 2016.

== Charts ==
=== Weekly charts ===
Chart (2016)	Peak position
Austria (Ö3 Austria Top 40)	58
Belgium (Ultratip Bubbling Under Wallonia)	14
Belgium (Ultratop 50 Flanders)	39
Canada (Canadian Hot 100)	93
Czech Republic Singles Digital (ČNS IFPI)	34
Denmark (Tracklisten)	32
Germany (GfK)	60
Hungary (Stream Top 40)	32
Ireland (IRMA)	73
Netherlands (Dutch Top 40)	15
Netherlands (Single Top 100)	29
Norway (VG-lista)	19
Portugal (AFP)	47
Slovakia Singles Digital (ČNS IFPI)	32
Sweden (Sverigetopplistan)	23
Switzerland (Schweizer Hitparade)	56
US Bubbling Under Hot 100 (Billboard)	7
US Mainstream Top 40 (Billboard)	39

=== Year-end charts ===
Chart (2016)	Position
Denmark (Tracklisten)	93
Netherlands (Dutch Top 40)	60
Netherlands (Single Top 100)	62
Sweden (Sverigetopplistan)	76

== Certifications ==
Region	Certification	Certified units/sales
Denmark (IFPI Danmark)	Platinum	90,000^{‡}
Germany (BVMI)	Gold	200,000^{‡}
Italy (FIMI)	Gold	25,000^{‡}
New Zealand (RMNZ)	Gold	15,000^{‡}
Sweden (GLF)	2× Platinum	80,000^{‡}
United States (RIAA)	Platinum	1,000,000^{‡}
^{‡} Sales+streaming figures based on certification alone.

== Release history ==
Country	Date	Format	Label	Ref.
Worldwide	March 18, 2016	Digital download	Forty8Fifty; Epic	
Italy	September 16, 2016	Contemporary hit radio	Sony	
