= Stony Brook Indoor Sports Complex =

Multi-purpose complex in Stony Brook University, Stony Brook, NY

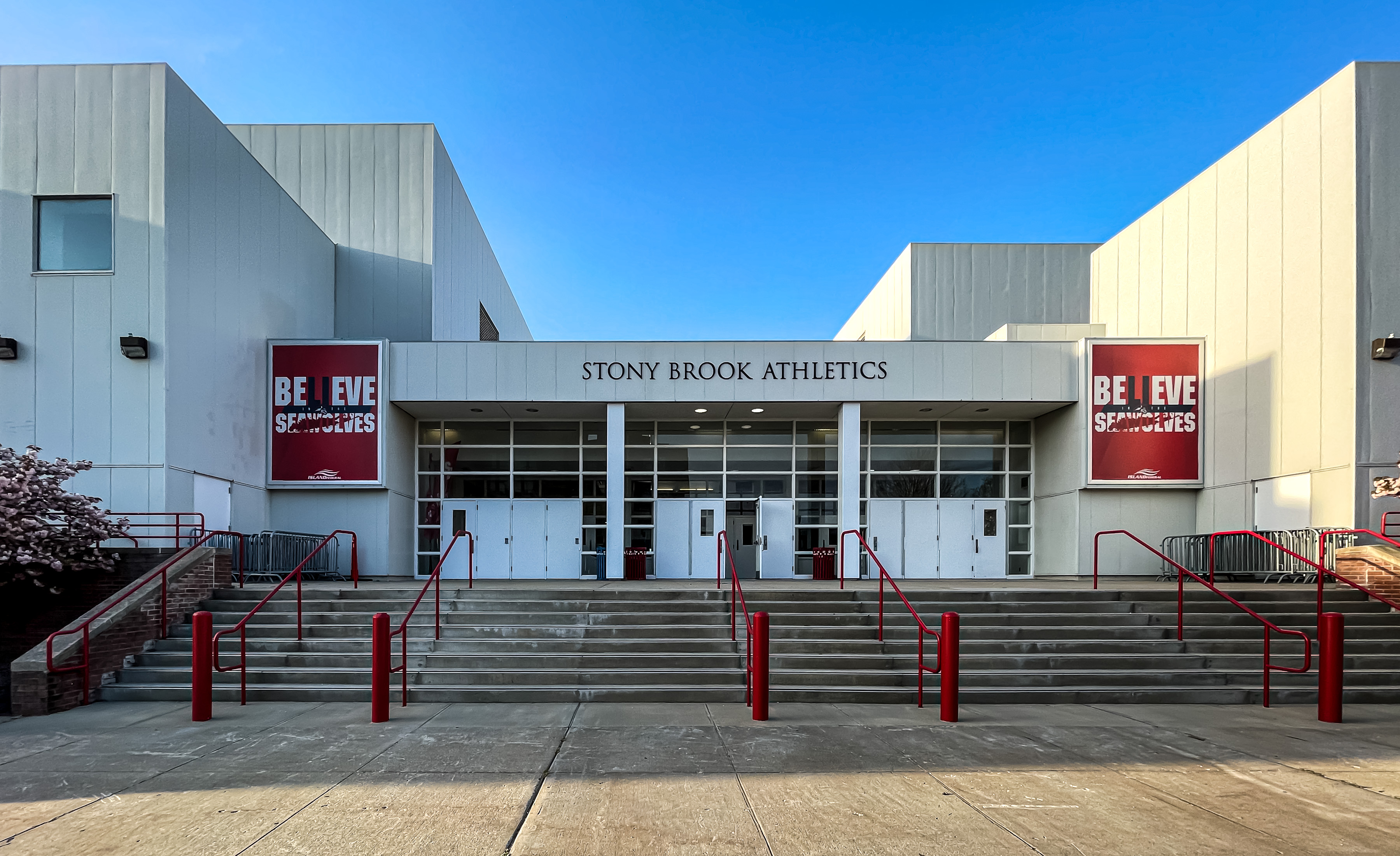
- The exterior of the Stony Brook Indoor Sports Complex.
- Interactive map of Stony Brook Indoor Sports Complex
- Location: 100 John S. Toll Drive, Stony Brook, New York, 11790
- Coordinates: 40°55′02.7″N 73°07′29″W
- Owner: State University of New York
- Operator: Stony Brook University

Construction
- Built: 1990

Tenant
- Stony Brook Seawolves (1990–present)

Website
- www.stonybrookathletics.com

The Stony Brook Indoor Sports Complex is a multi-purpose complex located in Stony Brook University, Stony Brook, NY. The Complex houses the Island Federal Arena on the west end, the Pritchard Gymnasium on the east end, the Dubin Family Athletic Performance Center on the north side, the Goldstein Family Student–Athlete Development Center, a 25-yard long swimming pool, and many other athletic facilities within. Currently, the Stony Brook Seawolves men's and women's basketball and volleyball programs’ home games are played in the Complex, with men’s and women’s basketball playing in the Island Federal Arena and volleyball playing in the Pritchard Gymnasium.

== Island Federal Credit Union Arena ==
Originally known as the Stony Brook University Arena, the west wing of the Stony Brook Indoor Sports Complex, consisting of the arena, opened in the fall of 1990. Originally home to the school's men's and women's basketball teams, the arena closed in 2011 as it underwent a $21.1 million renovation. Plans for renovation had begun as early as April 2008.

The arena reopened on October 3, 2014 and on October 28, it was announced that the arena would be renamed the Island Federal Credit Union Arena after naming rights were purchased by Island Federal Credit Union for $7 million.

Currently, Island Federal Arena contains a maximum capacity of 4,160 and contains four luxury suites and a VIP lounge area with premium courtside seating. The arena was the host of the 2016 America East Men's Basketball Championship Game, which saw Stony Brook defeat Vermont to reach their first ever NCAA Tournament.

In 2019, Island Federal Arena hosted Games 1 and 3 of the 2019 NBA G League Finals due to conflicts with the Long Island Nets' home court at the Nassau Coliseum.

== Pritchard Gymnasium ==
The lobby of the Sports Complex.

The Pritchard Gymnasium is one of the original buildings built on campus in the late 1960s. It currently serves as the home for Stony Brook volleyball, and is the former home of the men's and women's basketball programs. In the summer of 2008, the gym underwent a $1.5 million renovation to upgrade the seating, add a new scoreboard and refinish the hardwood floor. Pritchard Gymnasium holds a capacity of 1,970.

Stony Brook men's and women's basketball teams played at Pritchard Gymnasium as the Stony Brook Arena was being renovated. Pritchard Gymnasium became known for its significant home-court advantage. From 2011 to 2014, the Stony Brook's men's basketball team had a 37–3 record at home.

== Stony Brook University Swimming Pool ==
University Pool is the home to Stony Brook's women's swimming & diving program. The pool was recently renovated and opened in April 2017.

The Stony Brook University and the Department of Athletics held an official ribbon-cutting ceremony to re-open University Pool on Monday, May 15. The Seawolves' swimming and diving program was placed on competitive hiatus in 2012-13 following the announcement of critical maintenance renovation to University Pool. The renovations began in January 2015 when the existing pool was completely demolished, including the removal of the existing pool deck level.

== Dubin Family Athletic Performance Center ==
The Dubin Family Athletic Performance Center was officially opened on June 6, 2012 with a dedication ceremony. The 8,000 square-foot facility is named after Stony Brook alumnus Glenn Dubin, who made a $4.3 million donation for the construction of the project, which is the largest private donation ever to an athletics department within the State University of New York system. The world-class facility is located inside the Indoor Sports Complex and overlooks Kenneth P. LaValle Stadium. The new strength and conditioning facility includes 37,280 pounds of strength & conditioning equipment, an audio visual system for filming and training, a designated plyometric area for speed and sprint work, a nutritional oasis, a furnished office area, a large storage room and an outdoor patio area.
