= Gonakadet =

Mythical sea wolf

Gonakadet or Konakadeit, commonly referred to as the Sea-Wolf, is a mythical creature in the Tlingit tradition of the Pacific Northwest region of North America. It is also known as Wasgo by the Haida people. Simultaneously strong, generous and humble, the Sea-Wolf was said to bring great luck and wealth to anyone fortunate enough to spy it or hear its soulful howl.

According to artist Herem, Gonakadet myth is found among the Tsimshian, Tlingit and Haida peoples of British Columbia and Alaska and concerns the story of a sea monster who is a transformed human being. It is a complex and varied story, but the sighting of Gonakadet, either in his monster form or in the form of his splendid undersea house which sometimes rises above the waters, means the acquisition of wealth and good fortune."

Gonakadet may have been inspired by Vancouver coastal sea wolves, which are found in the Great Bear Rainforest and in northern Vancouver Island, within the Pacific Northwest.

The collegiate sports teams of the University of Alaska Anchorage have adopted the Seawolf as their mascot.

The extinct marine reptile Gunakadeit joseeae, whose holotype fossils were found in Tlingit land, was named in honor of the Seawolf.

== See also ==
- Akhlut
