= Richard McCormick =

Richard McCormick may refer to:

- Richard A. McCormick (1922–2000), Catholic Jesuit priest and moral theologian
- Richard C. McCormick (1832–1901), Governor of Arizona Territory, 1866–1869, and U.S. Congressman from New York, 1895–1897
- Richard D. McCormick (born 1940), American businessman
- Richard J. McCormick (born 1941), Catholic Salesian priest convicted of rape of boys
- Richard Levis McCormick (born 1947), American and president of Rutgers University, 2002–2012
- Richard P. McCormick (1916–2006), American presidential historian
- Rich McCormick (born 1968), American politician from the state of Georgia
