= Stony Brook University student housing =

Residential campus of State University of New York

Coordinates: 40°55′5″N 73°7′10″W

Student Housing
- Established: 1957
- Director: Dallas Bauman
- Students: 9,445 total
- Location: Stony Brook, New York, US
- Website: Campus Residences

Stony Brook University is the largest residential campus in the State University of New York system, with approximately 54.5% of its students living on campus. Housing at Stony Brook is issued and controlled by Stony Brook University Campus Residences, which provides 9,445 spaces in its 11 corridor style buildings, 19 suite style buildings, and 23 apartment style buildings to Undergraduate students, Graduate students, and students' families. The large majority of on-campus housing is provided to students on the university's west campus, but housing is available to those on east campus, and for Stony Brook Southampton students.

Campus residences is tied to Stony Brook's Undergraduate Colleges initiative in order to provide a better residential experience for the undergraduate community, especially for those in their first year. As such, the placement of all first year undergraduates and transfers is based on their Undergraduate College assignment (based on student interest, not major). Graduate students are not placed in the same manner, and are instead assigned housing based on preference and availability of space.

== Quad housing ==
There are six quads that make up the residential areas for undergraduate students at Stony Brook. They offer suite style floor plans or corridor style floor plans . The quads are:

- Roosevelt Quad (Corridor)
- H Quad (Corridor)
- Kelly Quad (Suite)
- Mendelsohn Quad (Corridor)
- Roth Quad (Suite)
- Tabler Quad (Suite)

Corridor style housing includes single, double, and triple rooms lined down a unisex hallway, with approximately 36 residents and one to two bathrooms per hallway. Suite style housing includes suites of six same-gendered people in three double bedrooms with a shared common space and bathroom. Bedrooms in suite style housing are smaller than corridor style, which are 150 sq. ft and 180 sq. ft respectively.

In Quad Housing, special living options exist based on student preference or need: Cooking (CO), 24-Hour Quiet (24Q), Modest Living, and Substance Free (SF). Students who choose these options are expected to adhere to the rules in the Terms of Occupancy as well as additional rules for the community such as no noise beyond room doors for 24 hour quiet, no alcohol paraphernalia for substance free living, and stricter rules regarding cleanliness for cooking buildings. There are also gender-inclusive living options available by request.

=== Corridor style ===
Roosevelt Quad

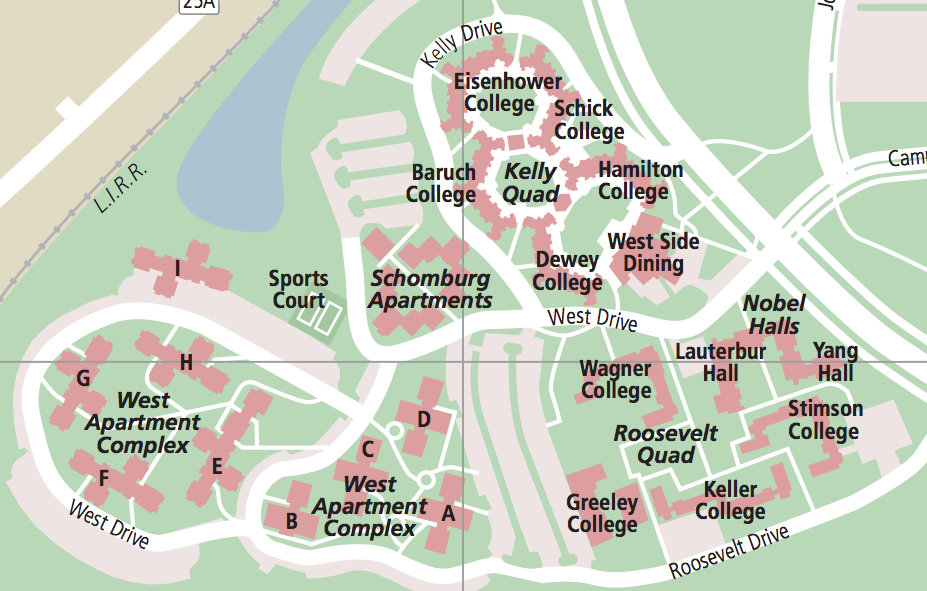
Roosevelt, Kelly, Schomburg and West Apartments

Eleanor Roosevelt quad, commonly abbreviated as ERQ, is made up of 5 residence halls: Greeley, Keller (SF), Stimson (24Q), Wagner and C.N. Yang Hall. All of these halls have a corridor style floor plan except for CN Yang hall, which is suite style. Residents placed in Roosevelt quad are part of the Global Studies undergraduate college (GLS) and as a result, there is a large emphasis on the global experience in residential programs put on in ERQ.

H-Quad

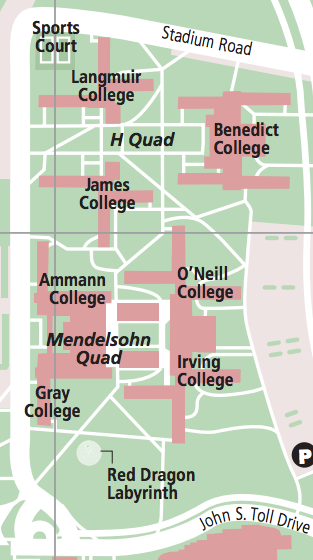
H-Quad and Mendelsohn Quads

H-Quad is made up of 3 buildings: Benedict, James (24Q & CO) and Langmuir (SF). The floor plan in all three buildings is corridor style. Residents placed in H quad belong to the Leadership and Service undergraduate college (LDS). The residential programs put on in H-Quad are largely focused on community service and community building.

H quad is home to two Living and Learning centers: the Community Service LLC in James college, and the Leadership Development LLC in Langmuir college. The Community Service LLC combines academics with community service via a minor in community service learning. The goal of this LLC is to build on research and methods of community service and involvement. The Leadership Development LLC combines academics with leadership strategies via a minor in Leadership development. The goal of this LLC is to create students who are grounded academically, and who know enough about leadership strategies to motivate the work of others in meaningful ways

Mendelsohn Quad

Mendelsohn Quad and surrounds Mendelsohn Pit and is made up of four buildings: Ammann (24Q), Gray (SF), Irving (CO) and O'Neil. All buildings have a corridor style floor plan composed of doubles. Mendelsohn quad residents belong to the Undergraduate College of Information Technology Studies (ITS), resulting in residential programs that emphasize technology in society.

The Red Dragon Labyrinth was located just south of Gray college. It is a seven-tier circular labyrinth, around 30 ft in radius, made of grass and red tree bark. It was donated to the university in 2004 by the United University Professions, the Protestant Campus Ministry, Radiation Protection Services, and University Hospital’s Department of Nuclear Medicine. Its goal was to help students achieve perspective and balance. It was taken down in 2014 to make room for the Chávez/Tubman Area.

=== Suite style ===
Kelly Quad

Kelly Quad is made up of six buildings: Baruch (SF), Dewey, Eisenhower, Hamilton, Schick (24Q) and Lauterbur. All buildings have a suite style floor plan composed of double rooms and common areas - these are the only suites on campus with balconies. Programing and residential learning in the quad is focused on identity exploration and human development, as per the Undergraduate College connected with the quad is Human Development (HDV)

The Health and Wellness LLC is offered through Schick college, and is meant to provide students with a foundation in the concepts of healthy living and help those looking for a career in the health professions via a minor offered through the LLC.

Roth Quad

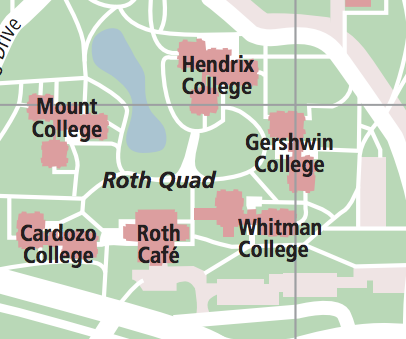
Roth Quad

Roth quad surrounds Roth pond and is made up of 5 buildings: Cardozo, Gershwin (24Q & CO), Hendrix, Mount (SF), and Whitman. All buildings have a suite style floor plan composed of doubles. Residents in Roth quad are part of the Science and Society Undergraduate College (SSO), placing and emphasis on the implications of not only science on society, but society on science. The buildings in Roth quad are the only quad style buildings that have air conditioning other than the Nobel Halls.

The living learning center in Roth quad is the Environmental Studies minor. It is based in Hendrix College and is meant to unite ecology, meteorology and oceanography in order to understand human impact on the environment.

The Roth Pond Regatta is an annual boat race held in Roth Pond since 1989. It is typically held during the last Friday of April, and the goal of the race is to get from one side of Roth pond to the other in a boat made of only cardboard, duct tape and paint. The event is judged by the Roth Pond Yacht club, and is funded by the Undergraduate Student Government. A fan of the event is Samuel L. Stanley, the university president.

Tabler Quad

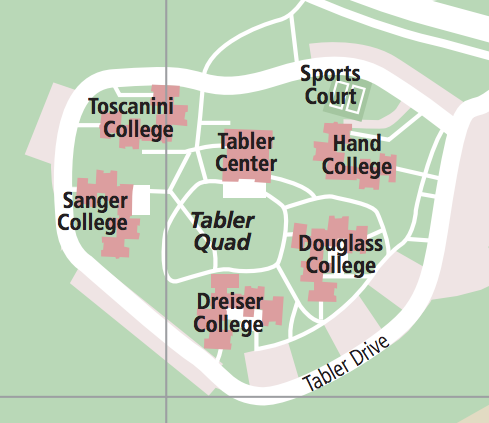
Tabler Quad

Tabler quad surrounds a meadow and is made up of 5 buildings: Douglass, Dreiser (24Q & SF), Hand (CO), Sanger and Toscanini. All buildings have a suite style floor plan composed of doubles. Residents in Tabler are part of the Undergraduate College of Arts, Culture and Humanities (ACH), placing a large emphasis on music and art and its relation to other disciplines. Additionally, Toscanni College houses the Stony Brook University honors college.

The Media Arts LLC minor is located in Tabler quad's Douglass college. The goal of this LLC is to help students better understand the types of media available in today's world and how art can be expressed through them, and involves working with the types of media available on campus, like SBUTV and WUSB. As of 10/24/2017, Judy Jaquez is the quad director, with Elanor Cavalone serving as Quad Office Service Manager.

The Tabler Center for the Arts, Culture and Humanities is also Located in Tabler, and is a common place for students to gather. There is a performance space and an art gallery present that displays artwork form both students and outside artists, such as Francisco Donoso and Jarred Beck, the two most recent artists in residence in the center.

The Nobel Halls

The Nobel Halls are the two interconnected buildings of Lauterbur Hall and Yang Hall. They have been awarded the Leadership in Energy and Environmental Design award for their eco-friendly design and high efficiency operation. They both consist of suite style floor plans, but belong to separate quads: Lauterbur is part of Kelly Quad, Yang is part of Roosevelt quad.

== Apartment housing ==
West apartments, Chapin apartments, and Schomburg apartments, along with the Chávez/Tubman area make up the four apartment style living areas on Stony Brook University's campus. Within Chapin, West and Schomburg, there are options of one and two bedroom apartments for couples and families, four to six bedroom apartments for undergraduate students, and three and four bedroom apartments for single graduate students and students in the Health Sciences Center. Each apartment also includes a kitchen area, a private bathroom, and in most cases, a large shared common-space.

=== West ===
The West apartments are a group of eleven buildings, comprising approximately 290 apartments. All buildings except West I are reserved for junior and senior undergraduate students in good academic standing. West I is reserved for masters and doctoral degree students. West Apartments is broken up into three areas, each with a different living arrangement:

- West I (West A, B, C, D) is composed of unisex apartments, each containing six people in two single rooms and two double rooms
- West II (West E, F, H) is composed of unisex apartments, each containing five or six people in single rooms
- West III (West G, I, J, K) is composed of unisex apartments, each containing five or six people in single rooms

West apartment residents may be students of West campus or of the Health Sciences Center. Some apartments are designated as gender-inclusive, where students can live together regardless of gender.

=== Schomburg ===
There are 72 apartments in the two buildings that make up the Schomburg apartments. These apartments are designed for graduate students and married couples. There are three floor styles available: one bedroom studio apartments for married couples, two-bedroom apartments for two single graduate students, and four-bedroom apartments for four single graduate students of either West campus or the Health Sciences Center.

=== Chapin ===
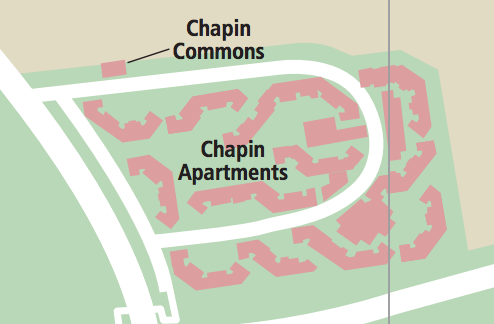
Chapin Apartments

Chapin apartments are designed for graduate students of the Health Sciences Center, and are located near the University Hospital. There are a variety of floor plans across the 12 Chapin apartment buildings: There are 1-bedroom apartments for couples and families, 2-bedroom apartments for 4 students, 3-bedroom apartments for 6 health sciences students, and 4-bedroom apartments for 4 health sciences students.

=== Chávez and Tubman ===
The Chávez and Tubman area is two suite-style buildings, Chávez and Tubman Halls. The area is commonly referred to as simply Toll, after its tentative name given from the road it's built on, John S. Toll Drive. The two buildings are notably not technically apartments, as they lack kitchens, making them legally suite-style buildings. However, they are managed as part of the Chapin Apartments system. Most suites contain 4 singles, with a few being bigger with 5. Notably, Chávez Hall is built on top of East Side Dining, the newest dining hall on campus, made to replace the recently renovated Stony Brook Union, which no longer has dining facilities.

== Criticism ==
Since 2001, Stony Brook University's Campus Residences has been accused of overbooking residence halls and assigning three people to bedrooms designed for two people. Commenting on earlier claims that the buildings are "poorly maintained", a member of the Schomburg Rent Review quoted that "the Chapin Complex was built [in 1981] to last 10 years." Also, protests broke out in 2010 over the fact that rent was increasing when graduate student stipends remained unchanged.
