= Mohamed-Slim Alouini =

Tunisian electrical engineer and academic

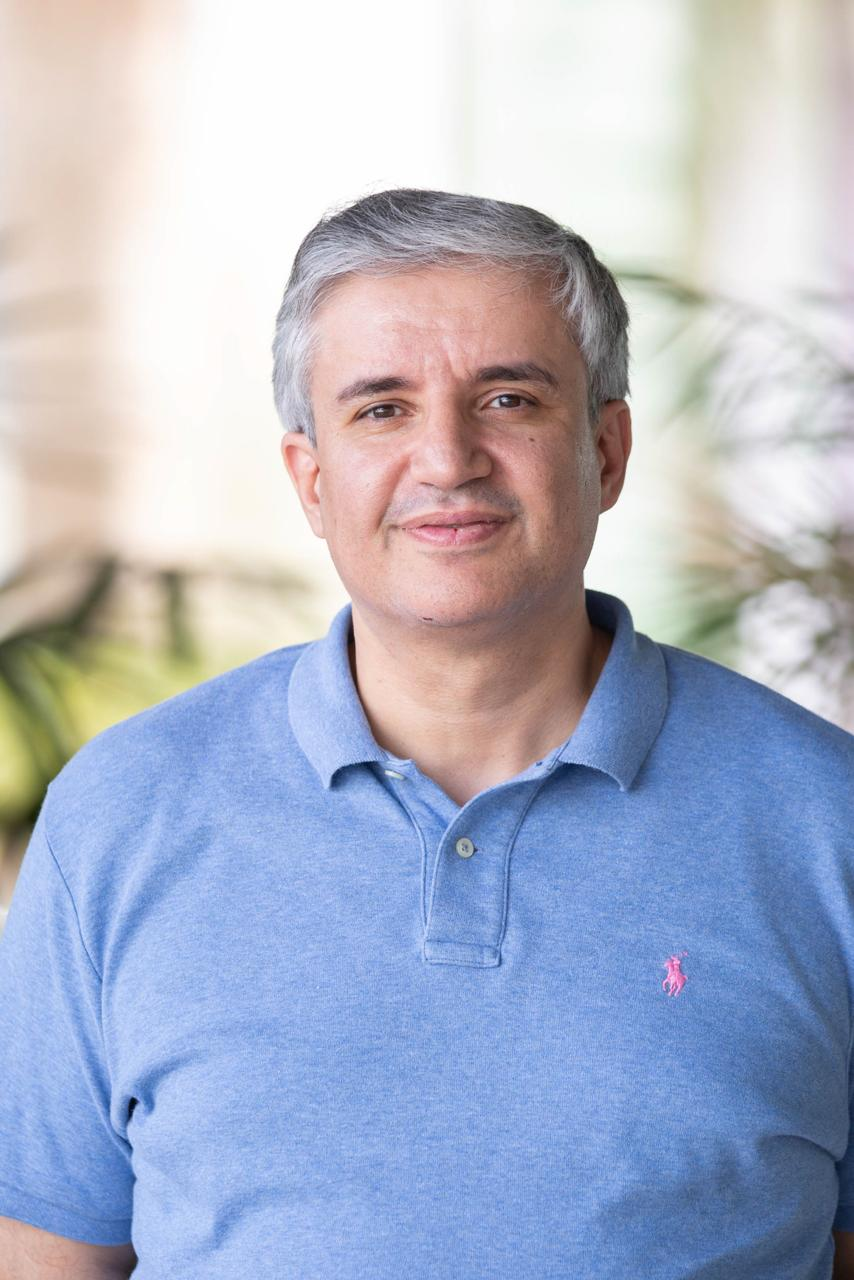
- Born: Tunis, Tunisia

Academic background
- Education: California Institute of Technology (PhD); Georgia Institute of Technology (MS); Pierre et Marie Curie University (DEA); Telecom Paris (Diplome d'Ingenieur)
- Thesis: Adaptive and Diversity Techniques for Wireless Digital Communications Over Fading Channels (1998)
- Doctoral advisor: Andrea Goldsmith

Mohamed-Slim Alouini is the Al-Khwarizmi Distinguished Professor of Electrical and Computer Engineering and the holder of the UNESCO Chair in Education to Connect the Unconnected at the King Abdullah University of Science and Technology (KAUST), Thuwal, Makkah Province, Saudi Arabia. His research interests include the modeling, design, and performance analysis of wireless, satellite, and optical communication systems.

== Early life and education ==
He was born in Tunis, Tunisia. In 1993, he obtained the Diplôme d'Ingénieur from École Nationale Supérieure des Télécommunications (Télécom Paris) and the Diplôme d'Études Approfondies (DEA) in Electronics from Université Pierre et Marie Curie (now Sorbonne Université), both in Paris, France. In 1995, he received the Master of Science in Electrical Engineering from the Georgia Institute of Technology, Atlanta, Georgia. In 1998, he completed his PhD in electrical engineering at the California Institute of Technology (Caltech), Pasadena, California, under the supervision of Andrea Goldsmith. In 2003, he obtained the Habilitation à Diriger des Recherches (HDR) from the Université Pierre et Marie Curie, Paris, France.

== Career ==
Alouini began his academic career as a faculty member in the Department of Electrical and Computer Engineering at the University of Minnesota, Minneapolis, where he served from 1998 to 2004. He subsequently joined Texas A&M University at Qatar, Education City, Doha, where he was based from 2004 to 2009. In 2009, he joined the King Abdullah University of Science and Technology (KAUST) as a founding faculty member, where he currently holds the Al-Khwarizmi Distinguished Professorship in Electrical and Computer Engineering and the UNESCO Chair on Education to Connect the Unconnected.

His research focuses on the modeling, design, and performance analysis of wireless communication systems, with a focus on aerial and space-based networks for connectivity in remote and underserved regions.

He is the co-author, with Marvin K. Simon, of the textbook Digital Communication over Fading Channels, published by Wiley-IEEE Press (first edition 2000, second edition 2005). He has served on the editorial boards of the IEEE Transactions on Communications, IEEE Transactions on Wireless Communications, and IEEE Transactions on Mobile Computing, and has been the Founding Editor-in-Chief of npj Wireless Technology since 2025.

Alouini has served as an IEEE Distinguished Lecturer for the IEEE Communication Society (2016–2017), the IEEE Vehicular Technology Society (2018–2022), the IEEE Aerospace and Electronic Systems Society (2023–2024), the IEEE Photonics Society (2025), and the IEEE Society on Social Implications of Technology (2026–present).

== Fellowship and Membership ==
Alouini was elected a Fellow of the Institute of Electrical and Electronics Engineers (IEEE) in 2009 for his contributions to the design and performance analysis of wireless communication systems. He was elected a Fellow of OPTICA (formerly the Optical Society of America) in 2021 for outstanding contributions to optical wireless communications. In 2025, he was named a Fellow of SPIE (the Society of Photo-Optical Instrumentation Engineers). In 2026, Alouini was elected an International Member of the United States National Academy of Engineering.

He is a Foreign Member of the Academia Europaea (2019) and a Member of the European Academy of Sciences and Arts (2019). He was elected a Fellow of the African Academy of Sciences in 2018. He became a Fellow of the UNESCO World Academy of Sciences (TWAS) in 2022 and a Fellow of the International Science Council (ISC) in 2023.

He is also a Fellow of the World Wireless Research Forum (WWRF) (2022) and a Fellow of the Asia-Pacific Artificial Intelligence Association (AAIA, now the International Academy of Artificial Intelligence Sciences) (2021).

== Awards ==
He received the 2024 IEEE Communication Society Technical Committee on Space and Satellite Communication (SSC) Distinguished Service Award and the 2022 UNESCO TWAS Award in Engineering Sciences.

In 2021, he received the IEEE Communications Society Education Award. In the same year, he was awarded the TAKREEM Foundation Award in the "Scientific and Technological Achievement" category, and the Obada Prize.

In 2020, he received the Kuwait Prize in Applied Sciences and the IEEE Vehicular Technology Society James Evans Avant Garde Award. In 2019, he received the IEEE Communication Society Communication Theory Technical Committee (CTTC) Technical Achievement Award.

He has also received the following awards and recognition:

- (2017) Inaugural Organization of Islamic Cooperation (OIC) Science & Technology Achievement Award in Engineering Sciences
- (2016) IEEE Communication Society Wireless Communications Technical Committee (WTC) Recognition Award
- (1999) National Science Foundation (NSF) CAREER Award
- (1999) Charles Wilts Prize, California Institute of Technology
