= Obada Prize =

International Award of Excellence

- Description: International Award of Excellence that aims to identify creative interdisciplinary research that cuts across traditional boundaries.
- Presented by: Natural Science Publishing, African Academy of Sciences (North African Branch)
- Hosted by: Essam Sharaf, Ahmed Amin Hamza, Moawad El-Kholey, Obada Abdel Shafy, Mahmoud Abdel-Aty, Arthur R. McGurn
- Established: 2018
- First award: 2018
- Final award: 2022

Highlights
- Total recipients: 32
- 2022 Distinguished Category Winners: Sohail Nadeem, Xiao-Jun Yang, Gehad G. Mohamed, Sherif El-Khamisy, Nageh Allam, Ayman Abdel-Khalik, Amir Gandomi.
- 2022 Young Distinguished Researchers Category Winners: Harish Garg, Mohamed Khairy, Jose Francisco Gomez Aguilar, Ali Akgül, Ali Sodhro, Ahmed Shalan, Reda M Abdelhameed, Ahmed Eid Kholif.
- 2022 Distinguished Students' Category: Aya Hussam El-din, Mahmoud Adel Hamza, Marah Masarweh, Samah Wael Fujo.
- Website: https://obadaprize.com
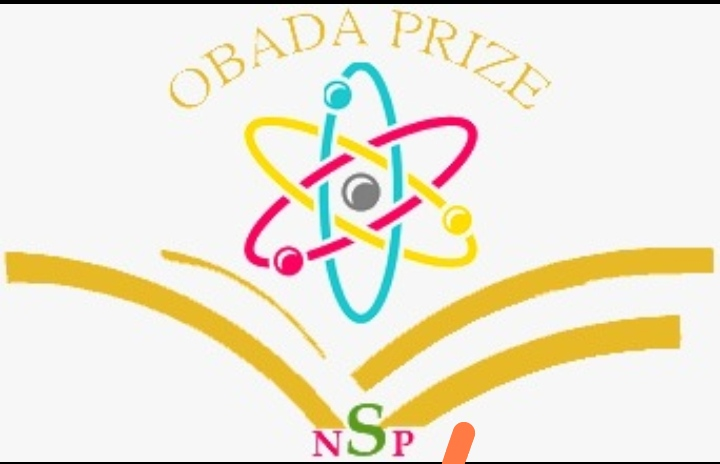

Obada Prize is an international award supported by the Natural Sciences Publishing and African Academy of Sciences (North African Branch). It was established to recognise the excellence of Egyptian Mathematics Emeritus Professor, Obada Abdel Shafy. The award aims to identify creative interdisciplinary research that cuts across traditional boundaries. It also aims at encouraging values and excellence that can promote the humanistic scientific and technological breakthrough that can improve our world.

== Obada-Prize award categories ==
Obada-Prize involves three categories and they are; Distinguished Researcher, Young Distinguished Researchers (who are aged 40 or below) and the undergraduate and Post Graduate Students.

== Obada Prize ceremony ==
At the Obada Prize Ceremony, the winners are given Certificates, Obada-Prize Medal and a document showing the Obada-Prize amount which can be used as a waver code for the publication fees in NSP International Journals.

== List of Obada prize award winners ==
=== 2022 ===
==== Distinguished Researchers' Category ====
Sohail Nadeem, a professor of mathematics at Quaid-i-Azam University, Pakistan.

Xiao-Jun Yang, a professor of Applied Mathematics and Mechanics at China University of Mining and Technology, China.

Gehad G. Mohamed, a professor at the Chemistry Department, Cairo University.

Sheref El-Khamisy, a professor of Molecular Medicine at the University of Sheffield, UK.

Nageh Allam , a Professor and Director of the Nanotechnology Graduate Program, American University, Egypt.

Ayman Abdel-Khalik, a professor of Electrical Engineering Department, Faculty of Engineering, Alexandria University

Amir Gandomi, a professor of Data Science and an ARC DECRA Fellow at University of Technology Sydney, Australia.
