= Sherif El-Khamisy =

Egyptian Professor of Biochemistry and Molecular Genetics

Sherif El- Khamisi
- Citizenship: Egypt
- Education: Cairo University (PharmD) Ain Shams University (Master of Science) American University in Cairo (Diploma) University of Sussex (PhD)
- Known for: Molecular biology, human genetics
- Awards: Biochemical Society Award Wellcome Trust Investigator Award Lister Research Fellowship Prize The State Award for Medical Sciences
- Scientific career
- Fields: Molecular biology, Genetics
- Workplaces: University of Sheffield; University of Sussex

Sherif El- Khamisy is an Egyptian Professor of Biochemistry and Molecular Genetics. He is the Director of Research and Innovation and co-founder of the Healthy Life Span Institute, University of Sheffield, United Kingdom. He is also one of the 2022 winners of Obada Prize

== Education ==
El- Khamisy obtained his first degree in pharmacy at Cairo University in 1997 and moved to Ain Shams University for his master's degree in the same course where he graduated in 2000. He obtained a Diploma in Business administration from American University in Cairo in 2002 and bagged his PhD in University of Sussex in 2005.

== Career ==
In 2005, he became a lecturer at department of Biochemistry, Ain Shams University, Egypt. In 2006, he was a post doctoral fellow at the Department of Genetics, St. Jude Children's Research Hospital, US. From 2007 to 2008, he was a MRC Post-doctoral Fellow, Genome Center, University of Sussex, UK. In 2008, he became a fellow of Wellcome Trust, Genome Center, University of Sussex. In 2013, he became a Reader at Krebs Institute, University of Sheffield and in the same year he became the group leader of Wellcome Trust. In 2014, he became the Chair of Molecular Medicine Department, Krebs Institute, University of Sheffield and in 2015, he became the Director of Research and Innovation of the institution.

== Awards and memberships ==
In 2004, he received the Biochemical Society Award and became a fellow of Wellcome Trust in 2008. He received The State Award for Medical Sciences in 2011 and the Lister Research Fellowship Prize in 2015. He is also a recipient of Wellcome Trust Investigator Award and Shoman Award for Medical Sciences in 2015 and 2016 respectively. In 2017 and 2018, he became a fellow of the Royal Society of Biology and the Royal Society of Chemistry.
