= Andrea Goldsmith (engineer) =

American electrical engineer

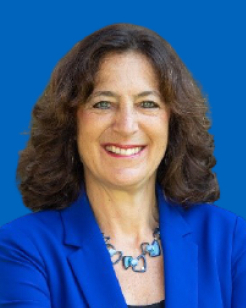

7th President of Stony Brook University
- Incumbent
- Assumed office August 1, 2025
- Preceded by: Maurie McInnis; Richard Levis McCormick (interim)

Personal details
- Born: July 4, 1964 (age 62)
- Education: University of California, Berkeley
- Scientific career
- Known for: Wireless communications
- Awards: IEEE ComSoc Edwin H. Armstrong Achievement Award; WICE Mentorship Award; National Academy of Engineering member American Academy of Arts and Sciences member Marconi Prize (2020)
- Fields: Electrical engineering
- Workplaces: Stony Brook University; Princeton University; California Institute of Technology; Stanford University
- Thesis: Design and Performance of High-Speed Communication Systems over Time-Varying Radio Channels (1994)
- Doctoral advisor: Pravin Varaiya
- Doctoral students: Mohamed-Slim Alouini
- Website: engineering.stanford.edu/people/andrea-goldsmith

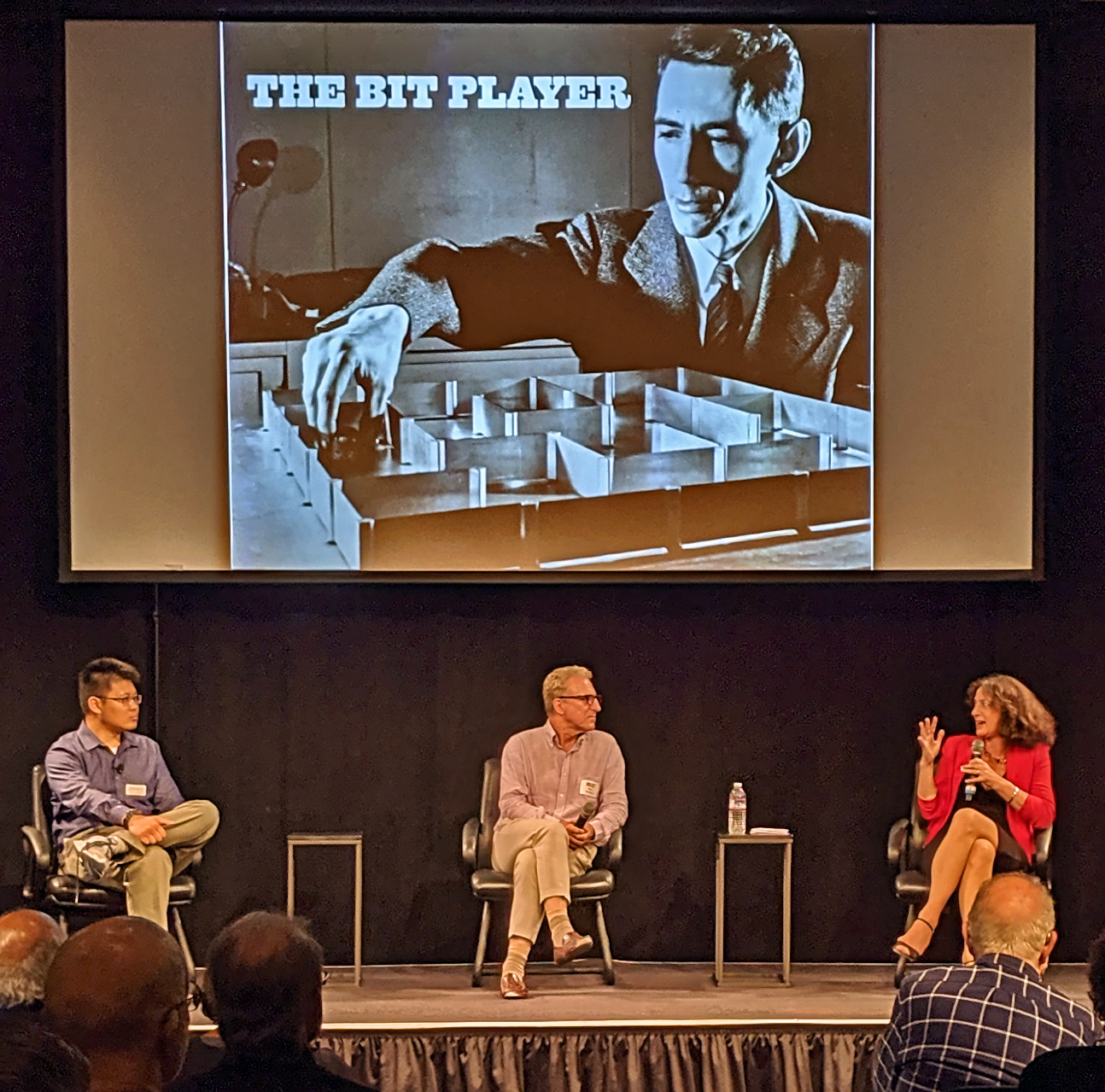
Andrea Goldsmith (right) at the panel discussion after the August 2, 2019, screening of The Bit Player at the Computer History Museum in Mountain View, California

Andrea Goldsmith FREng (born July 4, 1964) is an American electrical engineer and academic administrator. She has served as the seventh president of Stony Brook University since August 2025.

Goldsmith was previously dean of the School of Engineering and Applied Science and Arthur LeGrand Doty Professor of Electrical Engineering at Princeton University. Before Princeton, she was the Stephen Harris Professor in the School of Engineering at Stanford University, as well as a faculty affiliate at the Stanford Neurosciences Institute. Her interests are in the design, analysis and fundamental performance limits of wireless systems and networks, and in the application of communication theory and signal processing to neuroscience. She also co-founded and served as chief technology officer of Plume Wi-Fi and Quantenna Communications. Since 2021, she has been a member of the President’s Council of Advisors on Science and Technology (PCAST).

== Early life and education ==
Goldsmith was raised in the San Fernando Valley, California. Her father Werner Goldsmith was a professor of mechanical engineering at UC Berkeley, and her mother Adrienne Goldsmith was an animator for cartoon shows, including The Rocky and Bullwinkle Show. Goldsmith earned her bachelor's degree in engineering math from the University of California, Berkeley, in 1986, and her MS and PhD in electrical engineering from UC Berkeley in 1991 and 1994, respectively. In the years between obtaining her bachelor's and PhD, she spent four years as a systems engineer at a Silicon Valley defense communications startup.

== Work and academic career ==
Goldsmith started her academic career at the California Institute of Technology and was there for four years. She joined Stanford in 1999, becoming an associate professor in 2002 and a full professor in 2007. At Stanford, she served as chair of the faculty senate, and on the school's task force on women and leadership. In 2006, she took a leave of absence from Stanford and co-founded Quantenna Communications, a company that produces silicon chipsets designed for high-speed, wireless high-definition video home networking. She served as chief technology officer of the startup until returning to Stanford in 2008. She was also a founder and CTO of Plume Wi-Fi, which was founded in 2014 and develops Wi-Fi technology. She joined Princeton in 2020 as dean of Engineering and Applied Science at a pivotal time, when it is expected to grow its engineering faculty by 50%; build a new neighborhood with new buildings for all engineering departments and interdisciplinary institutes; and foster significantly more innovation, entrepreneurship, and partnerships with industry. In August 2025, Goldsmith became the seventh president of Stony Brook University, one of the nation's premier public research universities.

As an inventor and consultant, she has secured 38 patents. She has authored and co-authored several books, including Wireless Communication, MIMO Wireless Communications and Principles of Cognitive Radio. She has launched and led several multi-university research projects, including DARPA's ITMANET program, and she is a principal investigator in the National Science Foundation Center on the Science of Information.

In the IEEE, Goldsmith served on the board of governors for both the Information Theory and Communications societies. She has also been a distinguished lecturer for both societies, served as president of the IEEE Information Theory Society in 2009, founded and chaired the Student Committee of the IEEE Information Theory Society, and chaired the Emerging Technology Committee of the IEEE Communications Society. She chairs the IEEE Committee on Diversity and Inclusion.

She won the 2017 Women in Communications Engineering Mentorship Award from the IEEE Communications Society for her efforts in encouraging women in the fields of technology and engineering. In 2017, she was elected to the Academy of Arts and Sciences, and also to the National Academy of Engineering for contributions to adaptive and multiantenna wireless communications. Goldsmith won the 2020 Marconi Prize, generally recognized as the top prize in communications.

She was also invested Doctor Honoris Causa of the University of Málaga (Spain) in 2024.

In August of 2025, Goldsmith was appointed to become the seventh president of Stony Brook University.

In June of 2026, Goldsmith was named in Long Island Business News' Women Leaders 2026.

== Awards ==
- IEEE fellow for contributions to the development of adaptive techniques and the analysis of fundamental capacity limits for wireless communication systems in the year 2005.
- National Academy of Engineering Gilbreth Lecture Award, 2002
- Silicon Valley Business Journal Women of Influence Award, 2010
- IEEE Communications Society Edwin H. Armstrong Achievement Award, 2014
- Member, National Academy of Engineering, 2017–present
- Member, American Academy of Arts and Sciences, 2017–present
- Women in Communications Engineering (WICE) Mentorship Award, 2017
- ACM Athena Lecturer Award, 2018
- Marconi Prize, 2020
- IEEE Claude E. Shannon Award, 2027

== Publications ==
=== Books and book chapters ===
- Entropy, Mutual Information, and Capacity for Markov Channels with General Inputs, T. Holliday, A. Goldsmith, P. Glynn, Stanford University Press, 2002
- EE359 Wireless Communications, A. Goldsmith, Stanford University Press, 2002
- Wireless Communications, A. Goldsmith, Cambridge University Press, 2005
- MIMO Wireless Communications, E. Biglieri, Cambridge University Press, 2007
- Principles of Cognitive Radio, A. Goldsmith, L. Greenstein, N. Mandayam, H.V. Poor, Cambridge University Press, 2012

== Personal life ==
Goldsmith lives in Old Field, New York, with her husband, scientist Arturo Salz.
