= Sohail Nadeem =

Pakistani mathematician

Sohail Nadeem is a Pakistani Professor of Applied Mathematics and Chairman of Mathematics Department at Quaid-i-Azam University. He is Fellow of the world Academy of sciences and an elected Fellow of Pakistan Academy of Sciences. He is a recipient of the 2022 Obada Prize Award.

== Early life and education ==
Sohail Nadeem was born on 15 March 1975. He attended Quaid-i-Azam University, Islamabad, Pakistan from his first degree to the PhD level. He obtained his M.Sc., M.phil and PhD in 1998, 2000 and 2004 in Applied Mathematics.

== Career ==
In 2000, he was appointed as a Senior research assistant at the department of Mathematics at the Quaid-i-Azam University Islamabad. In 2002, he became a lecturer at COMSATS Institute of Information Technology Abbottabad. In 2003, he became an assistant Professor the same institution. In 2005, he moved to Quaid-i-Azam University Islamabad also as an Associate Professor and in 2011, he became an associate professor and eventually become a professor in 2015.

== Awards and memberships ==
In 2011, he received the Young fellow World Academy of Sciences Award by the third world Academy of Sciences, Italy. In 2012, he was elected as a member of Pakistan Academy of Sciences. In the same year, he received the Salam prize for Mathematics by the same institution. Additionally, He received the Productive scientist Awards by PCST for the years 2012–2013 in A category and in 2016 he was awarded Pakistan Academy of Sciences gold medal in Mathematics and he was eventually elected in as a member in 2019. In 2022, he won the Obada Prize award. In 2023, he became a laureate of the Asian Scientist 100 by the Asian Scientist.
