= Robert L. Barchi =

American academic (born 1946)

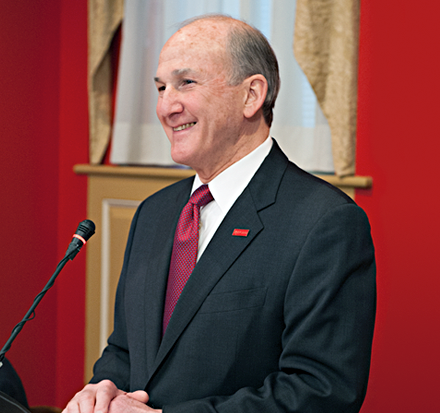
- Barchi in 2012

20th President of Rutgers University
- In office April 11, 2012 – June 30, 2020
- Preceded by: Richard Levis McCormick
- Succeeded by: Jonathan Scott Holloway

President of Thomas Jefferson University
- In office 2004–2012

Provost of the University of Pennsylvania
- In office 1999–2004

Personal details
- Born: November 23, 1946 (age 79) Philadelphia, Pennsylvania, U.S.
- Spouse: Francis Harper Barchi
- Children: 2 (and 2 stepchildren)
- Education: Georgetown University; University of Pennsylvania

Robert Lawrence Barchi (born November 23, 1946) is an American neurologist, physician, and scientist. He was the 20th president of Rutgers University, holding the position from September 1, 2012, to June 30, 2020. Barchi was appointed to the position on April 11, 2012, to succeed Richard L. McCormick. Previously, Barchi was president of Thomas Jefferson University in Philadelphia, prior to which he was provost of the University of Pennsylvania.

Barchi's appointment came as Rutgers was preparing to absorb most of the schools, programs and facilities of the University of Medicine and Dentistry of New Jersey following the approval of a merger proposal by the New Jersey Legislature and the Governor of New Jersey during the summer of 2012.

== Early life and education ==
Robert Lawrence Barchi was born on November 23, 1946, in Philadelphia. He was raised in Westfield, New Jersey. He earned a B.S. and an M.S. at Georgetown University and then a Ph.D. and an M.D. from the University of Pennsylvania. He trained in neurology at the Hospital of the University of Pennsylvania. He was part of the Medical Scientist Training Program.

== Career ==
Barchi began as his career an assistant professor in the Department of Biochemistry and Biophysics at the University of Pennsylvania. By 1985, he was the David Mahoney Professor of Neurological Sciences. He served as director of the Mahoney Institute of Neurological Sciences from 1983 to 1996. In 1992, Barchi became the chairman of the Department of Neuroscience at the Perelman School of Medicine, a department that he had founded. He led the Department of Neurology from 1995 to 1999.

Barchi's research in neuroscience and neurology has been supported by the National Institutes of Health. His most extensive research focus has been on voltage-gated ion channels in nerve and muscle and the role these molecules can play in human disease. He was elected to the Institute of Medicine of the National Academy of Sciences, the American Society for Clinical Investigation, and the Association of American Physicians. He is a fellow of the American Association for the Advancement of Science, the American Neurological Association, and the American Academy of Neurology. He has won the Jacob K. Javits Award from the National Institutes of Health.

He was provost of the University of Pennsylvania from 1999 to 2004. Barchi served as president of Thomas Jefferson University from 2004 to 2012 and president of Rutgers University from 2012 to 2020.

At Thomas Jefferson University, Barchi oversaw establishment of the College of Pharmacy and College of Population Health, expanded oncology programs, and increased student enrollment by 51 percent. He also doubled the level of annual fundraising.

Barchi oversaw the formation of Rutgers Biomedical and Health Sciences in 2013 and the entrance of Rutgers University-New Brunswick into the Big Ten Conference a year later. He led the establishment and construction of an honors college at New Brunswick that contributed to a 50-point rise in average SAT scores of incoming students over four years. Barchi welcomed President Barack Obama to speak at the 2016 commencement ceremony celebrating Rutgers' 250th anniversary year. He directed $2.5 billion in new construction at Rutgers and an increase in annual fundraising from $95 million in 2012 to $251 million in 2019. Barchi helped negotiate an agreement between Rutgers and RWJBarnabas Health in 2018 to jointly operate New Jersey's largest academic health system.

In July 2019, he announced that he would retire at the end of the 2019–2020 school year.

== Personal life ==
Barchi is married to Francis Harper Barchi, an academic on faculty at Rutgers' Edward J. Bloustein School of Planning and Public Policy. Barchi is an authority on timepieces, with a special interest in their history and mechanical development. He has two adult children, Jonathan and Jennifer, and two adult step-children, Faris and Millan.
