= Nageh Allam =

Egyptian Professor of materials science and engineering

- Education: Cairo University (BS, MS); Pennsylvania State University (PhD)
- Known for: Founder of the AUC Energy Materials Laboratory (EML); research on semiconductor nanoarchitectures for renewable energy
- Awards: TWAS Young Scientist Award (2015); State of Egypt Award in Advanced Technological Sciences; African Academy of Sciences Fellow (2020); Obada Prize for Distinguished Scientists (2022)
- Scientific career
- Fields: Energy conversion and storage, solar energy, water desalination, nanostructured materials

Nageh Allam is an Egyptian Professor of materials science and engineering at the American University in Cairo (AUC). He is the Director of the Nanotechnology graduate program of the institution. He is a receiver of the World Academy of Sciences Young Scientist Award, Obada Prize Award and an elected member of the African Academy of Sciences.

== Education ==
Nageh Allam obtained his B.Sc. and M.Sc. degrees from Cairo University he moved to Pennsylvania State University for his PhD in Materials Science and Engineering. In 2010, he joined Georgia Institute of Technology and Massachusetts Institute of Technology (MIT) for his post doctoral studies.

== Career ==
In 2011, Nageh Allam joined MIT as a research Scholar at the Department of Electrical Engineering and Computer Science and in the same year, he returned to Egypt where he became assistant professor at American University in Cairo.

== Memberships and awards ==
In 2009, Allam biography was published by the International Biographical Center, Cambridge, England as one of the top 100 scientists. In 2015, he received the World Academy of Sciences (TWAS) Young Scientist Award and was elected as a member of the African Academy of Sciences in 2020. He was a beneficiary of three years Ford Foundation international graduate fellowship, RAK-CAM postdoctoral fellowship, the Abdel-Hamid Showman Foundation Award in Applied Sciences, the State of Egypt Encouragement Award in Advanced Technological Sciences, the State of Egypt Excellence Award in Advanced Technological Sciences, and the AUC Excellence in Research and Creative Endeavors Award. In 2022, he won the Obada Prize for distinguished scientists award.
