= List of presidents of Stony Brook University =

The president of Stony Brook University is the chief executive of Stony Brook University.

Stony Brook's President, in addition to their duties to the university's many academic programs, also oversees the Stony Brook University Hospital with its five health science programs and 120 community-based service centers. The President additionally plays an integral role in the economic development of Long Island, New York through Stony Brook's capacity as co-manager of the Brookhaven National Laboratory.

The duties of the President are tied to a broader governance structure of the State University of New York system, including its Chancellor, Board of Trustees, University Faculty Senate and Student Assembly. Furthermore, the President receives oversight and advice from the Stony Brook Council, presently chaired by Kevin S. Law, President and CEO of the Long Island Association.

The current Interim President is Richard L. McCormick. On July 1, 2020, Maurie D. McInnis assumed office as the 6th President of Stony Brook, the second woman in the university's history appointed to that position. Andrea Goldsmith was appointed as the 7th President of Stony Brook in February 2025.

== Dean of State University College on Long Island ==
Dean	Term of office	Notes
Leonard K. Olson (1914 - 2002)	1957 - 1961 (Four years)	Oversaw the managing of the Oyster Bay campus while organizing and planning for the Stony Brook campus. He recruited top faculty from elite institutions such as Oxford University, Columbia University, University of Chicago, and Yale University. Olsen was considered a strong leader and champion for student rights, a beloved figure within the Oyster Bay community.

== Presidents of Stony Brook University ==
Several persons have led Stony Brook University since 1961:

No.	President	Term start	Term end	Refs.
1	John Francis Lee	January 1, 1961	November 9, 1961 (Note: Fired by Board of Trustees)	
Acting (Note: Acting Administrative Head (direct rule by the President of the State University of New York))	Thomas H. Hamilton	November 9, 1961	August 31, 1962	
Acting (Note: Acting Chief Administrative Officer (direct rule by the Executive Dean in SUNY Central))	Karl D. Hartzell	September 1, 1962	August 31, 1965	
2	John S. Toll	September 1, 1965	June 30, 1978	
Acting	T. Alexander Pond	July 1, 1978	May 31, 1979	
Acting	Richard Schmidt	June 1, 1979	June 30, 1980	
3	John H. Marburger III	July 1, 1980	August 31, 1994	
4	Shirley Strum Kenny	September 1, 1994	June 30, 2009	
5	Samuel L. Stanley Jr.	July 1, 2009	July 31, 2019 (Note: Resigned to lead Michigan State University.)	
Interim	Michael A. Bernstein	August 1, 2019	June 30, 2020	
6	Maurie D. McInnis	July 1, 2020	June 30, 2024 (Note: Resigned to lead Yale University.)	
Interim	Richard L. McCormick	August 1, 2024	July 31, 2025	
7	Andrea Goldsmith	August 1, 2025	present	

Table notes:

== Provosts of Stony Brook University ==
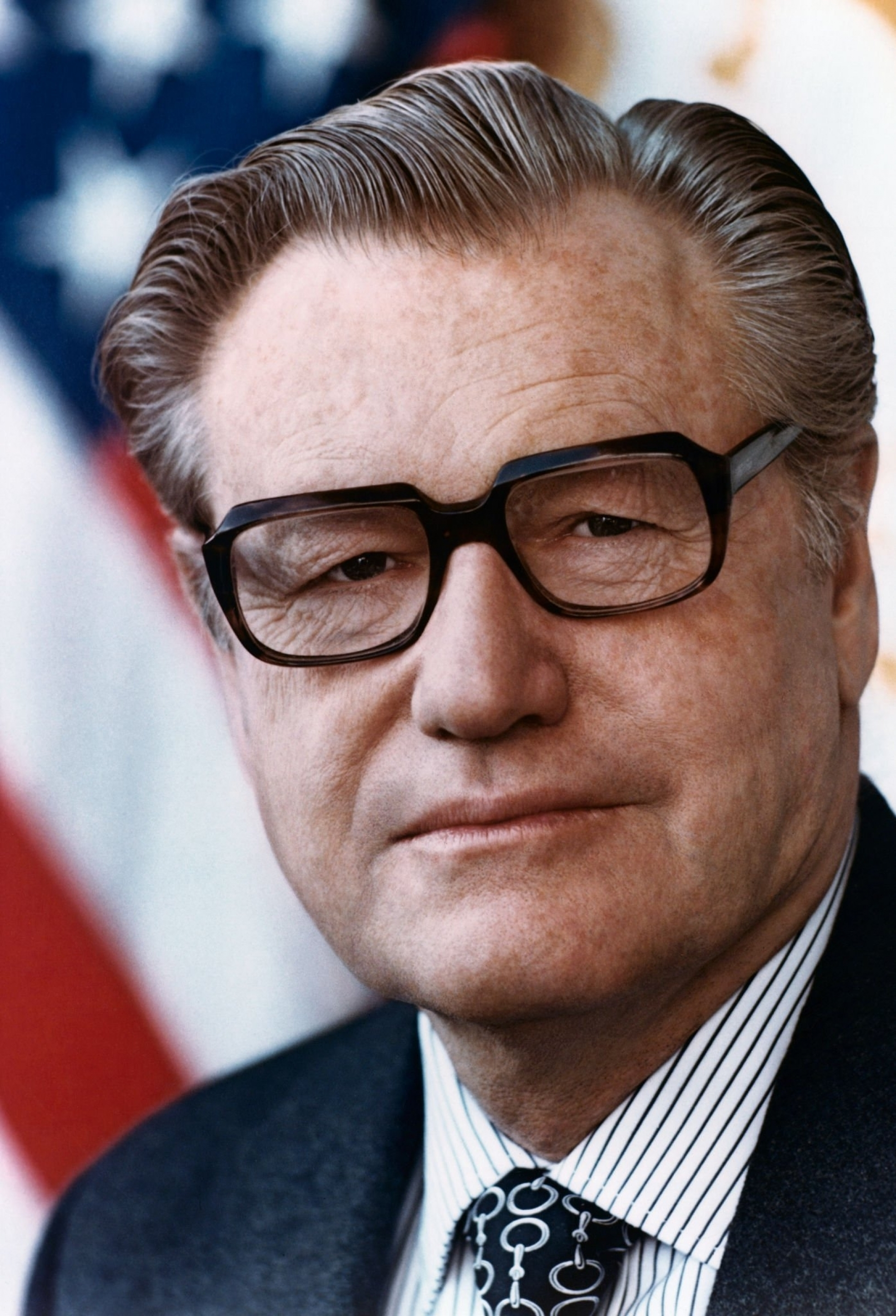
Nelson A. Rockefeller, Governor of New York (1959-1973), commissioned the construction of a state university on Long Island to "stand with the finest in the country"

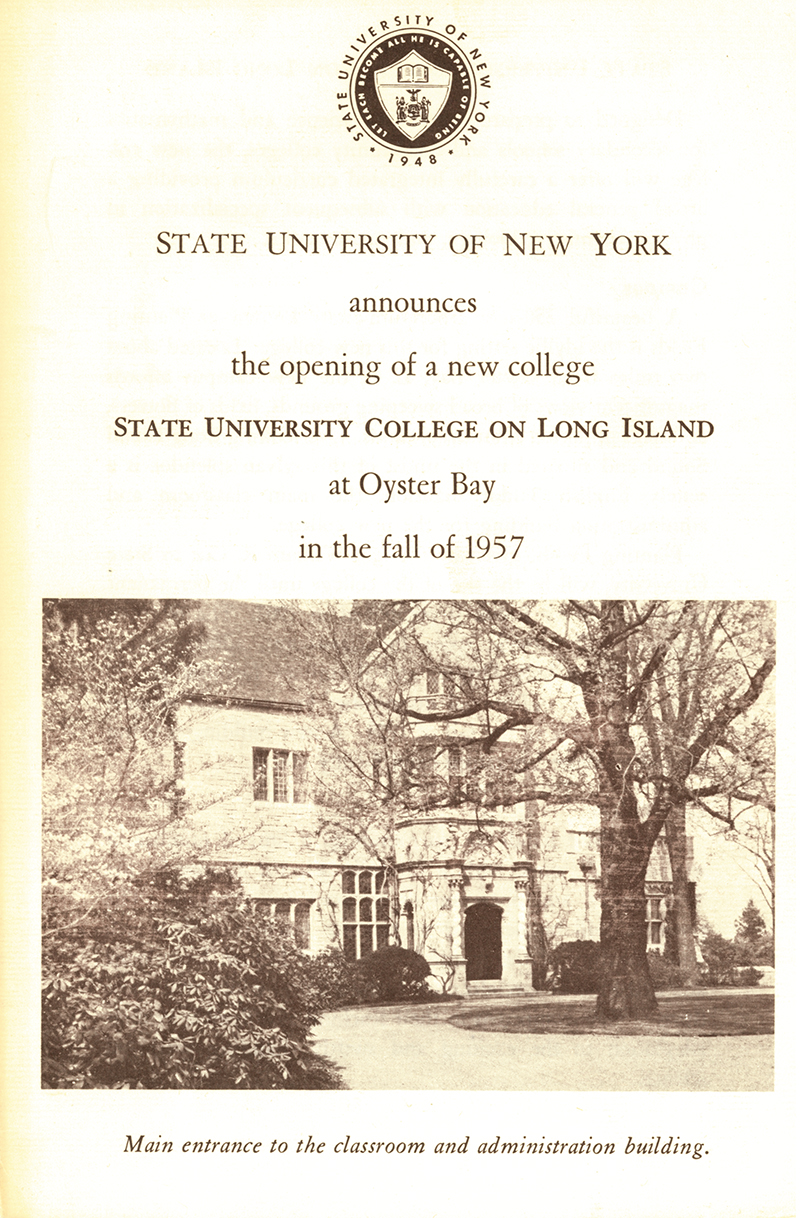
State University on Long Island, Announcement of a new college of The State University of New York, 1948

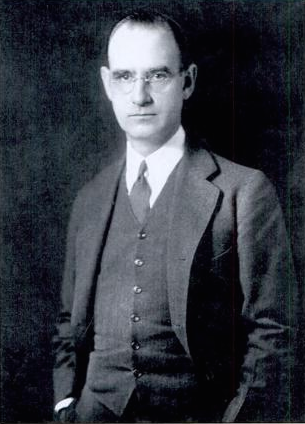
Ward Melville, businessman and philanthropist (1887–1977), donated 400 acres of land in Stony Brook, New York to establish a major public research institution on Long Island.

No.	Provost	Term of office
1	H. Bentley Glass	1965–1971 (6 years)
2	Sidney Gelber	1971–1981 (10 years)
3	Homer A. Neal	1981–1986 (5 years)
4	Jerry R. Schubel	1986–1989 (3 years)
5	Tilden G. Edelstein	1989–1994 (5 years)
6	R. Bryce Hool	1994–1995 (1 year)
7	Rollin C. Richmond	1996–1999 (3 years)
8	Robert L. McGrath	1999–2007 (8 years)
9	Eric W. Kaler	2007–2011 (4 years)
10	Dennis Assanis	2011–2016 (5 years)
	Charles Taber (interim)	2016 (Jun-Oct)
11	Michael A. Bernstein	2016–2019 (3 years)
	Minghua Zhang (interim)	2019–2020 (1 year)
	Michael A. Bernstein	2020 (3 months)
	Fotis Sotiropoulos (interim)	2020–2021 (6 months)
13	Paul Goldbart	2021–2022 (10 months)
	Mónica Bugallo (interim)	2022 (5 months)
14	Carl Lejuez	2022–present (4 years, 4 months)

== Presidents of University Senate ==
Presidents of Stony Brook University Senate
Term	President
1975	Max Dresden
1976	Norman Goodman
1977	Bill Jim Layton
1978-1979	Gary Thomas
1980-1981	Fred Goldhaber
1981-1983	Ron Douglas
1984	Joel Rosenthal
1985	Lawrence Slobodkin
1986	Benjamin Walcott
1987	Donald Petrey
1988	Andrea Tyree
1989	William Van Der Kloot
1990	Norman Goodman
1991	Barbara Elling
1992	Richard Porter
1993	Bernard Dudock
1994	Egon Neuberger
1995	Aldustus Jordan
1996-1997	Jolyon Jesty
1997-1999	Robert Kerber
1999-2001	Bill Godfrey
2001-2002	Benjamin Walcott
2002-2006	W. Brent Lindquist
2006-2009	Bernard Lane
2009-2010	Michael Schwartz
2010-2014	Frederick Walter
2014-2018	Edward Feldman
2018-2020	Nancy Tomes
2020-2024	Richard Larson
2024-	Brenda Anderson
