= Maurie McInnis =

American historian and author (born 1966)

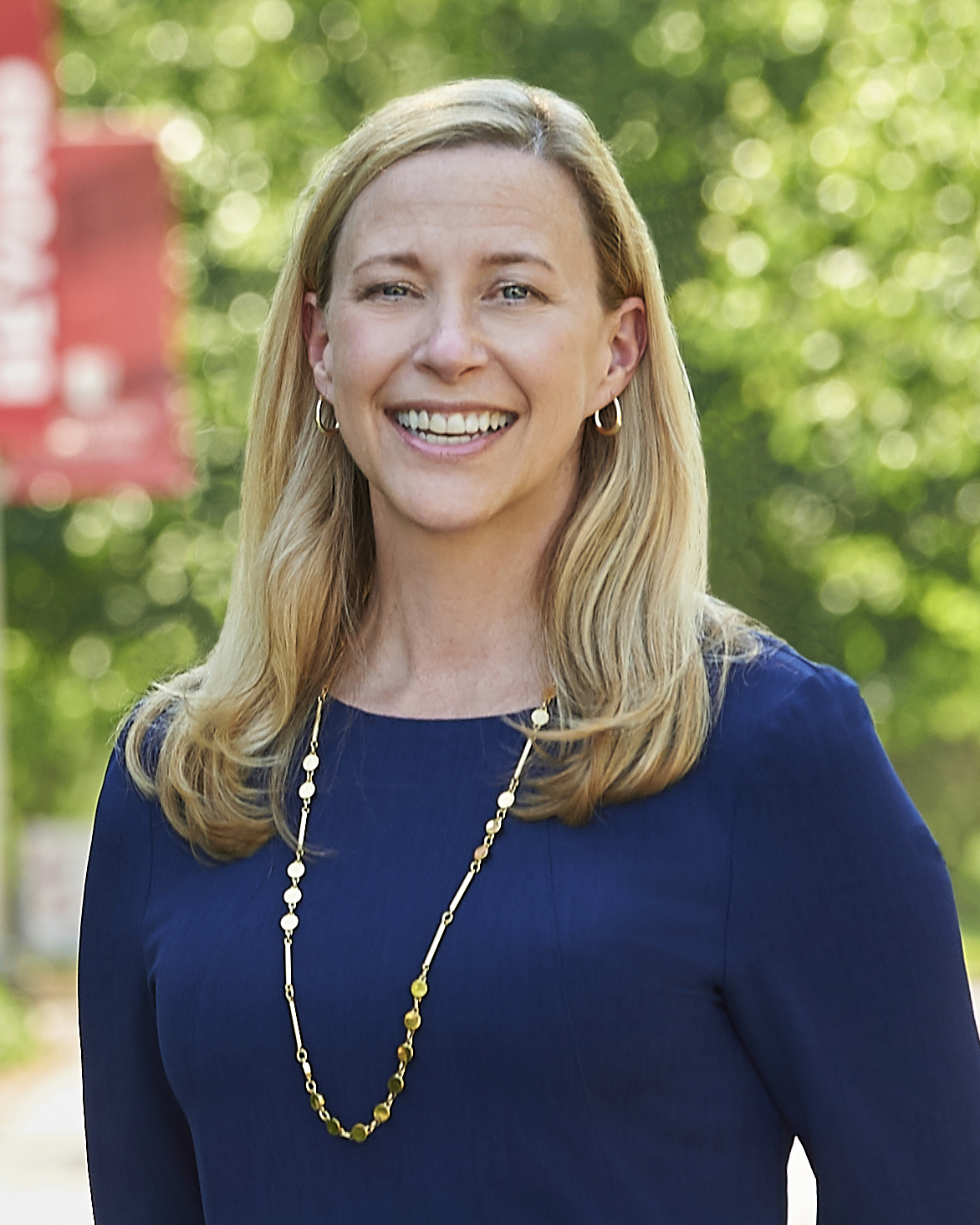
- McInnis in 2020

24th President of Yale University
- Incumbent
- Assumed office July 1, 2024
- Preceded by: Peter Salovey

6th President of Stony Brook University
- In office July 1, 2020 – June 30, 2024
- Preceded by: Samuel L. Stanley; Michael Bernstein (interim)
- Succeeded by: Richard Levis McCormick (interim)

Personal details
- Born: January 11, 1966 (age 60) St. Petersburg, Florida, U.S.
- Education: University of Virginia (BA); Yale University (MA, MPhil, PhD)

Academic background
- Thesis: The politics of taste: Classicism in Charleston, South Carolina, 1815-1840 (1996)
- Doctoral advisor: Edward S. Cooke

Academic work
- Discipline: Art history
- Institutions: University of Virginia; University of Texas at Austin; Stony Brook University

Maurie Dee McInnis (born January 11, 1966) is an American art historian who has been the 24th president of Yale University since July 2024. She was previously the 6th president of Stony Brook University from 2020 to 2024.

McInnis is a scholar in the cultural history of American art in the colonial and antebellum South, focusing on the history of academia, cultural trends, and slavery.

== Education ==
McInnis received a Bachelor of Arts with a major in art history from the University of Virginia in 1988. She was a Jefferson Scholar when she was an undergraduate student at the University of Virginia.

McInnis received a Master of Arts in 1990, a Master of Philosophy in 1993, and a Ph.D. in 1996, all in art history from Yale University. Her doctoral dissertation was titled The politics of taste: Classicism in Charleston, South Carolina, 1815-1840. Her doctoral advisor was Edward S. Cooke.

== Career ==
=== Academic research ===
McInnis is a scholar in the cultural history of American Art in the colonial and antebellum South. Her work has focused on the relationship between art and politics in early America, especially on the politics of slavery. Her first book, "The Politics of Taste in Antebellum Charleston," was awarded the Spiro Kostof Award by the Society of Architectural Historians.

Her 2011 book, "Slaves Waiting for Sale: Abolitionist Art and the American Slave Trade" was awarded the Charles C. Eldredge Book Prize from the Smithsonian American Art Museum as well as the Library of Virginia Literary Award for nonfiction. In 2019 University of Virginia Press published her co-edited volume, "Educated in Tyranny: Slavery at Thomas Jefferson's University." She has also served as a curator, consultant, and advisor to multiple art museums and historic sites.

=== Provostship ===
McInnis served as vice provost for academic affairs at the University of Virginia. Over her almost 20 years' experience at UVA, McInnis held various academic leadership and administrative appointments, including vice provost for academic affairs, associate dean for undergraduate education programs in the College of Arts and Sciences, director of American Studies, and as a professor of art history. She joined the faculty of UVA in 1998, earned tenure in 2005 and became a full professor in 2011.

McInnis served as the provost of the University of Texas at Austin from 2016 to 2020.

=== Stony Brook University ===
On March 26, 2020, McInnis was announced as the sixth president of Stony Brook University. She began serving in this role on July 1, 2020. McInnis won several political battles in support of Stony Brook University, including securing a $500 million donation from Jim Simons' Simons Foundation (the second-largest gift to a public university in American history), and a $700 million bid to lead the New York Climate Exchange campus on Governors Island.

On May 13, 2024, the Stony Brook University Faculty Senate defeated a motion to censure McInnis, by a count of 55–51, over her role with regards to the arrest of 29 pro-Palestinian campus protestors and removal of a pro-Palestinian encampment earlier that month.

=== Yale University ===
In April 2024, the Yale Daily News reported that McInnis, who was appointed to Yale's Board of Trustees in 2022, was a candidate for the presidency of Yale University. On May 29, 2024, McInnis was announced as the 24th president of Yale University. McInnis was formally installed on April 6, 2025 at an inauguration disrupted by pro-Palestine protestors calling for university divestment from weapons companies, becoming the first woman to serve as a non-interim president at Yale.

In 2026, McInnis began negotiations to settle an investigation by the Trump administration that accused Yale of giving preferential treatment to Black and Hispanic applicants. The move drew backlash from students, faculty, alumni, and Connecticut politicians.

== Awards and honors ==
- National Endowment for the Humanities
- Virginia Foundation for the Humanities
- Charles C. Eldredge Prize, presented to Slaves Waiting for Sale: Abolitionist Art and the American Slave Trade, for outstanding scholarship in the field of American Art, 2012.
- Library of Virginia Literary Award for non-fiction, 2012 for Slaves Waiting for Sale: Abolitionist Art and the American Slave Trade.
- Spiro Kostof Book Award, Society of Architectural Historians, presented to The Politics of Taste in Antebellum Charleston for the book that has made the greatest contribution to our understanding of urbanism and its relationship with architecture, 2007.
- Fred B. Kniffen Book Award, Pioneer America Society, presented to The Politics of Taste in Antebellum Charleston for the best book in the field of material culture in North America, 2007.
- George C. Rogers, Jr. Book Award, South Carolina Historical Society, presented to The Politics of Taste in Antebellum Charleston for the best book about South Carolina, 2006.
- Thomas Jefferson Visiting Fellow, Downing College, Cambridge University

== Selected publications ==
- McInnis, Maurie (1999). In pursuit of refinement: Charlestonians abroad, 1740-1860. Gibbes Museum of Art (Charleston, S.C.), Historic Charleston Foundation (Charleston, S.C.). Columbia: University of South Carolina Press. ISBN 1-57003-314-5. OCLC 40444158.
- Fama, Vicki, ed. (2005). A Jeffersonian ideal: selections from the Dr. and Mrs. Henry C. Landon, III collection of American fine and decorative arts. Charlottesville: University of Virginia Art Museum. ISBN 0-9706263-2-0. OCLC 62588093. – McInnis contributed "entries on individual pieces."
- McInnis, Maurie (2005). The politics of taste in antebellum Charleston. Chapel Hill: The University of North Carolina Press. ISBN 0-8078-2951-X. OCLC 57392004.
- McInnis, Maurie; Nelson, Louis P., eds. (2011). Shaping the body politic: art and political formation in early America. Charlottesville: University of Virginia Press. pp. 128–161. ISBN 978-0-8139-3102-9. OCLC 663101340. – In addition to co-editing, McInnis also contributed the chapter, "Revisiting Cincinnatus: Houdon’s George Washington"
- McInnis, Maurie (December 2011). Slaves waiting for sale: abolitionist art and the American slave trade. Chicago: University of Chicago Press. ISBN 978-0-226-55933-9. OCLC 703870842.
- McInnis, Maurie; Nelson, Louis P., eds. (2019). Educated in tyranny: slavery at Thomas Jefferson's university. Charlottesville: University of Virginia Press. ISBN 978-0-8139-4286-5. OCLC 1088648616.

Academic offices
Preceded by Samuel L. Stanley	6th President of Stony Brook University; 2020–2024	Succeeded by Andrea Goldsmith
Preceded by Peter Salovey	24th President of Yale University; 2024–present	Incumbent
