= Obada Abdel Shafy =

Egyptian Emeritus professor (born 1942)

Professor Abdel-Shafy Fahmy Obada FAAS
- عبدالشافى فهمى عباده
- Born: 1942 (age 83–84); Egypt
- Occupations: Academician, Researcher
- Title: The President of the Egyptian Mathematical Society and the Editor-in-Chief for the Journal of the Egyptian Mathematical Society,

Academic background
- Education: Assiut University; Manchester University England
- Thesis: Mathematical Treatment of Microscopic Optics (1967)
- Doctoral advisor: Robin K. Bullough

Academic work
- Discipline: Mathematician
- Institutions: Al-Azhar University

Abdel-Shafy Fahmy Obada FAAS (Arabic: عبدالشافى فهمى عباده) is an Egyptian professor of mathematics at the Department of Mathematics, Faculty of Science, Al-Azhar University. He is an elected member and the former Vice president of African Academy of Sciences. A fellow of the British Institute of Physics, a founding member and the first president of the Egyptian Mathematical Society.

== Early life and education ==
Abdel-Shafy Fahmy Obada was born in 1942. He was one of the pioneer student of new Assiut University where he obtained his B. SC Mathematics in 1962. In 1967, he obtained his doctorate degree from University of Manchester Institute of Science and Technology now ( University of Manchester, England) in England and he was awarded D.Sc. degree from University of Manchester Institute of Science and Technology (UMIST).

== Career ==
Obada started his career in 1962 as a Demonstrator of mathematics at the Assiut University. After his PhD, he was appointed as lecturer in the department of Mathematics, Faculty of Science of Al-Azhar University in Cairo in 1969 and he became Senior Lecturer in the same university in 1974. However, he left in 1975 to become an associate professor at King Abdulaziz University in Jeddah, Saudi Arabia where he taught Mathematics for four years. In 1979, he returned to Al-Azhar University in Cairo as a professor of Applied Mathematics. He was the chairman of the department of mathematics for two years and the Secretary to the Board of the Faculty of Science for four years.

== Awards and memberships ==
Obada became fellow of the Egyptian Academy of Sciences in 1995 and a fellow of the British Institute of Physics in 2000. A year later, he became a fellow of the African Academy of Sciences, and He emerged as the vice-president of the African Academy of Sciences from 2004 to 2013. In 2004, he received the Egyptian State Prize for Scientific Creativity in Basic Sciences. In 2005, he bagged the State Recognition Prize in Basic Sciences. In 2008, he received the Elsevier prize for scientific publications and citations. In 2011, he was given the Misr El-Kheir Prize for highly cited papers. In 2012, he was awarded the Nile Award in Science from the Academy of Scientific Research & Technology. In 2013, he was elected as a member of the Academy of Arabic Language. In 2014, he received the State Sciences and Arts Medal of the First Order and in 2019, he became the African Union's Kwame Nkrumah Laureate of Basic Science, Technology and Innovation Award (2019).

== Obada prize ==
Obada Prize is an international award established by the Natural Sciences Publishing in recognition of Professor Abdel-Shafy Obada's contributions that the field of science.

== Selected publications ==
- R K Bullough, A-S F Obada, B V Thompson and F Hynne, Microscopic Theory of the Einstein optical scattering equations, Chemical Physical Letters 2 (5) (1968), 293–296.
- R K Bullough, P J Caudrey and A-S F Obada, Theory of radiation reaction and atom self-energies: all-order perturbation theory of the generalized non-relativistic Lamb shift, Journal of Physics A: Mathematical, Nuclear and General 7 (13) (1974), 1647–1663.
- A-S F Obada and R K Bullough, Optical propagators and properties of the finite molecular crystal, Physica 42 (3) (1969), 475–481.
- A-S F Obada and R K Bullough, Dielectric constants for the cubic molecular crystal, Chemical Physical Letters 3 (1969), 114–117.
- -S.F. Obada, A.M.M. Abu-Sitta, Electric- and magnetic-dipole contributions to the reaction field theory, Physica A: Statistical Mechanics and its Applications, Volume 93, Issues 1–2, 1978, Pages 316–326, ISSN 0378-4371, https://doi.org/10.1016/0378-4371(78)90225-X.
