= Undergraduate Colleges of Stony Brook University =

Undergraduate Colleges
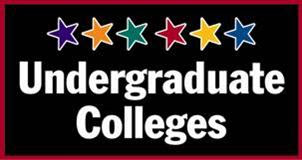
- Established: September 2004
- Director: Anastasia Zannetis
- Students: ~15,000
- Location: Stony Brook, New York
- Website: Undergraduate Colleges

Stony Brook University has an undergraduate population of around 15,000 students. To create a sense of community, the Undergraduate Colleges of Stony Brook University were developed. These Undergraduate Colleges (or UGCs) function as smaller communities within the larger university and are themed to provide an academic aspect to each student's interests. Notable programs offered include first-year advising, UGC-themed events, and smaller seminar courses.

== Undergraduate College Program ==
There are three themed undergraduate colleges. They are:

- Creativity, Technology, and Innovation (CTI)
- Social Justice, Equity, and Ethics (SJE)
- Global Health, Wellness, and Community (GWC)

Each college has dedicated staff members who help students acclimate themselves to the university. There is also a faculty member (known as the Faculty Director of the college) whose purpose it is to provide academic support to the UGC, as well as two to three advisors whose sole purpose is to plan the UGC's events and guide students within their academic life; finally, an assistant director, is employed to ensure that the students are adjusting to living in student housing, since the student's undergraduate college determines where they'd be staying for their housing placements.

Students choose their preference of Undergraduate College based on their interest (not necessarily what they are to major in) when they are accepted to the university and are required to take two courses in their first year, one per semester, pertaining to their undergraduate college placement. These courses are generally known as SBU 101 and SBU 102, but differ according to each college.

=== First Year Seminar 101 and 102 ===
The 101 course for each UGC is a 1 credit course that is typically 20 students large and is taught by a staff member related to the college (such as the undergraduate college advisor) and a Fellow who is typically a sophomore undergraduate student in the UGC. The purpose of the course is to familiarize the student with the university and resources available to them. It also functions to allow students a small space to open up and know other students, as lecture classes with greater than 100 students are common for first year students in the university. The material presented in the 101 course does not have much to do with the theme of the college and has more to do with the university itself.

The 102 course is a 1 credit course taught by a faculty member and is very heavily influenced on the theme of the undergraduate college. For instance, the SJE SBU 102 offerings are courses that only pertain to Social Justice, Equity, and Ethics. The goals of the course are to expand the view of the students in the undergraduate college, allow students the opportunity to work closely with Faculty members, and allow students to acclimate themselves to academic seminar type classes they may take the future.

The University Scholars Program, Honors College Program, Transfer Advising programs also offers a 101 courses where students, regardless of undergraduate college, take an equivalent SCH, HON or ADV 101 seminar instead of their UGC seminar.

=== Advisement ===
The university offers advice to first year students through the Undergraduate colleges. The advisors in a given UGC do the work of normal academic advisors, but can give students guidance on issues that relate to their first year, such as deciding on a major, dealing with being away from home, and how to navigate the services on campus. They also play a major role in student registration as they are the first advisors students encounter in their first year.

== Undergraduate College Centers ==
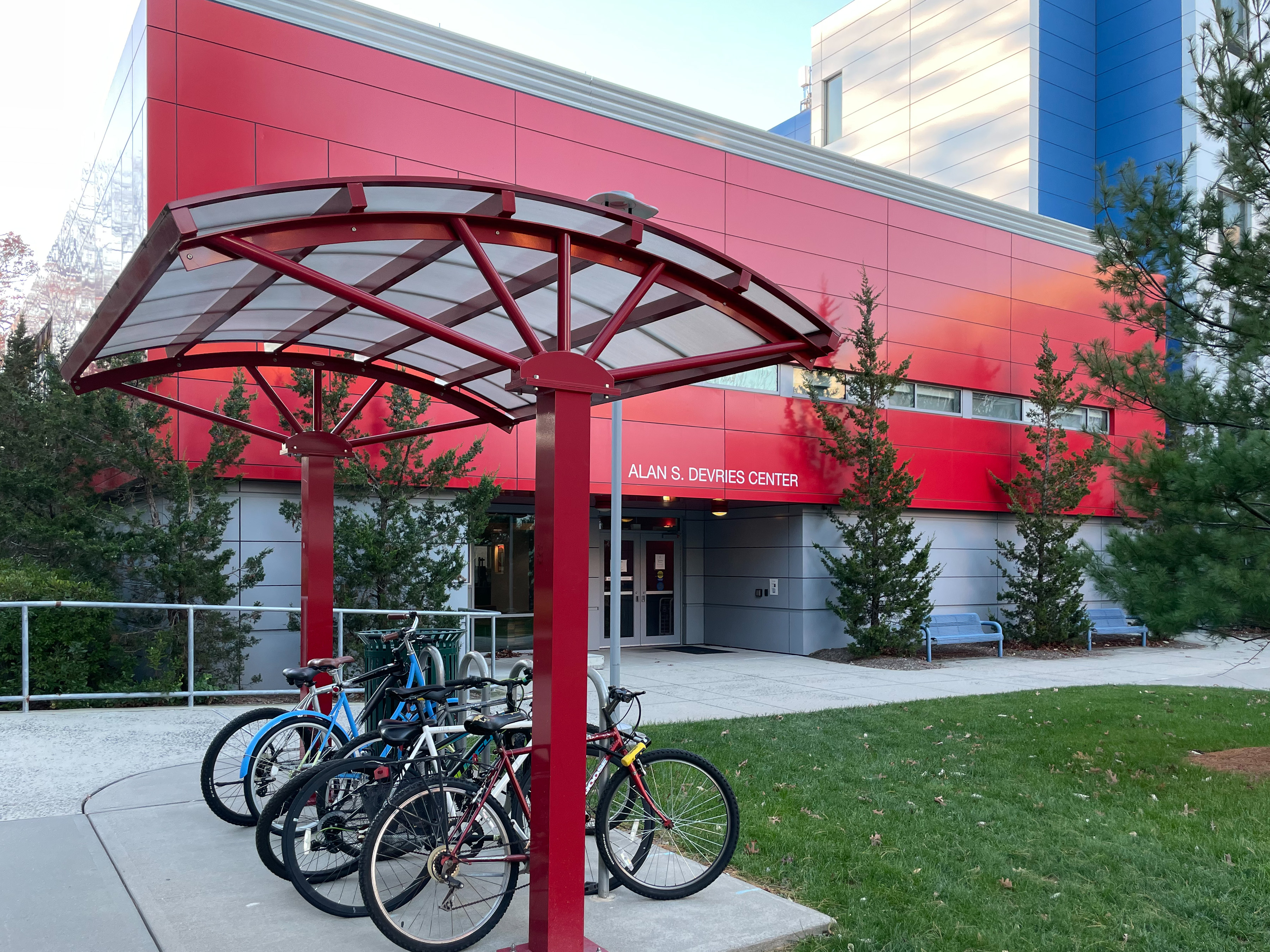
Alan S. deVries Center

There exists a center for each undergraduate college in which most of the colleges events occur, most sections of UCG courses take place, and the advisors hold office hours. These centers are located in or adjacent to the area that is most connected to the Undergraduate College. The centers are:

- The Alan S. deVries Center, located in between Roosevelt and Kelly Quads, connected to the Nobel Halls, serves the college of Creativity, Technology, and Innovation.
- The Grey Center, located in the basement of Grey College in Mendelssohn Quad, serves the college of Social Justice, Equity, and Ethics.
- The Dallas W. Bauman Center for Leadership and Service, located in Benedict College in H-Quad, serves the college of Global Health, Wellness, and Community.

They are typically places where students also gather to study or do work. Most of the centers have special aspects about them to differentiate themselves from the others. For instance, the Bauman Center has the largest free-to-students programing space in the university.

== Involvement Beyond the First Year ==
Although the undergraduate colleges are targeted to first year students, it is possible to stay involved beyond the first year if a student wishes to do so. As upperclassmen, students may become "Fellows" for their undergraduate college where they are expected to help out at new student orientation, TA a SBU 101 class, and put on programs for the freshmen students in the college. Students may also intern for the college or Resident Assistants in the UGCs quad; this role would involve them to partake in organising events around the college.
