= Ahmed Amin Hamza =

Egyptian physics emeritus professor

- أحمد أمين حمزة
- Born: March 8, 1941 (age 85); Egypt
- Education: Ain Shams University (BSc 1962, MSc 1967, PhD 1972)
- Known for: President of Mansoura University (1994–2001); Founding President of the British University in Egypt (2005–2010)
- Scientific career
- Fields: Fiber optics, optical metrology, polymer physics, material science

Ahmed Amin Hamza FAAS FRMS SPIE (Arabic: أحمد أمين حمزة) is an Egyptian emeritus professor of physics at the Faculty of Science, University of Mansoura. He was a former President and Vice President of the institution and an ex-President of the British University in Egypt. He is a member of African Academy of Sciences and a fellow of the institute of physics.

== Early life and education ==
Ahmed Amin Hamza was born on March 8, 1941. He obtained his first degree, B. Sc Physics and Chemistry, from Ain Shams University, Cairo in 1962 with Honors. In 1964 and 1967, he received a diploma degree in Optical Metrology and M. Sc in Physics respectively. In 1972, he obtained his PhD in physics from the same institution .

== Career ==
After his first degree, he was appointed as the head of Colour-section, Cairo Dyeing and Finishing Company, Cairo in 1962. A year after his M. Sc, he became the Head of Printing Department of the same company. In 1972, he became a lecturer of Physics at the Faculty of Science in University of Mansoura, Egypt. In 1976, he became as assistant Professor, in 1981, he became professor of Experimental Physics and in 2001, he became an emeritus professor in the same Institution.

== Administrative appointments ==
He was the Head of Physics Department, Faculty of Science, University of Mansoura from 1984 - 1986 and the Vice Dean of the Faculty of Science from 1986 - 1992. He was the Vice President for Community and Environmental Development, University of Mansoura for two years; August 1992 - August, 1994. He became the President of the University of Mansoura on August 5, 1994 and left the position in July 31, 2001. From 2005 to 2008, he was the vice President of British University in Egypt and In 2008, he became the President of the same institution; a position that he left in 2013.

== Memberships and fellowships ==
In 1977, he became a Fellow of the Royal Microscopical Society, FRMS in Oxford and in 1982, he became a Fellow of the Institute of Physics in London. He became part of International Society for Optical Engineering SPIE in 1989 and in 1995, he became a Member of the New York Academy of Sciences. In the same year, he became a Member of the Egyptian Academy of Sciences, African Academy of Sciences and American Association for the Advancement of Science

== Award ==
In 1987, he received the Egyptian National Award in Physics and in 1992, he was awarded University of Mansoura Award of Merit. In 1995, he received Egyptian President distinguished merit award and in the same year, he received the Scientists Certificate of Merit from the Academy of Scientific Research & Technology, and the Egyptian Syndicate of Scientific Professions. In 1997, the State Prize of Merit in Basic Science, three years later, he received Doctor honoris causa (Dr.h.c) from the Technical University of Liberec, Czeck Republic. In 2005, he received the El-Nile "Mubarak" Prize in Advanced Technological Science, The highest National award in Egypt.
