= Richard P. McCormick =

American historian

Richard Patrick McCormick
- Born: December 24, 1916; Ridgewood, New York, U.S.
- Died: January 16, 2006 (aged 89); Bridgewater Township, New Jersey, U.S.
- Occupations: Historian and university professor

Richard Patrick McCormick (December 24, 1916 – January 16, 2006) was an American historian, former university professor of history, administrator, professor emeritus at Rutgers University in New Brunswick, New Jersey, and president of the New Jersey Historical Society. McCormick was internationally recognized for his expertise in New Jersey and early American political history.

== Early life and education ==
Born in Queens, New York City, on December 24, 1916, McCormick moved with his family to Tenafly, New Jersey. He graduated from Tenafly High School in 1933, and was encouraged to apply for college by a typing teacher in his senior year. He had not planned on attending college and had been in enrolled in a "general curriculum" that lacked the required courses he needed to apply for college. During a post-graduate year at Tenafly High School, he completed the four years of math courses he needed to be eligible for college enrollment.

McCormick received a Bachelor of Arts (A.B.) in history from Rutgers College at Rutgers University in New Brunswick, New Jersey, in 1938 and proceeded to earn a Master of Arts (A.M.) from Rutgers' Graduate School in 1940. During his undergraduate years, McCormick was elected to Phi Beta Kappa. He earned his Doctor of Philosophy (Ph.D.) in 1948 from the University of Pennsylvania in Philadelphia, where his dissertation was titled, Experiment in Independence: New Jersey in the Critical Period, 1781-1789, and was edited for his first monograph.

== Career ==
In 1945, McCormick began teaching at the department of history at Rutgers University. From 1961 to 1962, he was a fellow of Jesus College at the University of Cambridge in the United Kingdom. In August 1945, McCormick married Katheryne Levis in Baltimore, whom he met at the University of Delaware in Newark, Delaware, when he was teaching in the university's Army Specialized Training Reserve Program in 1944.

McCormick was chair of the Rutgers College history department from 1966 to 1969 and dean of Rutgers College from 1974 to 1977. In 1971, he chaired a committee on coeducation at Rutgers College (which had previously admitted men only) and in 1969 he chaired a special faculty committee to address issues raised by African-American students at Rutgers.

McCormick retired from teaching in 1982.

McCormick was instrumental in the establishment of several influential historical organizations, including the New Jersey Historical Commission, the New Jersey State Historical Records Advisory Board and the New Jersey Tercentenary Commission, and served as research adviser to Colonial Williamsburg, and as a member of the American Revolution Bicentennial Commission.

His books The Second American Party System: Party Formations in the Jacksonian Era (1966) and Rutgers: A Bicentennial History (1966) received the biennial book prize from American Association for State and Local History in 1965 and 1968, respectively. In 2002, McCormick was recognized with the Award for Scholarly Distinction from the American Historical Association.

A longtime resident of Piscataway, New Jersey, McCormick moved with his wife to Bridgewater Township, New Jersey, where he lived in his final years.

== Death ==
McCormick died on January 16, 2006, in Bridgewater Township, New Jersey, at the age of 89 following an extended illness. He was the father of two children, Dorothy (b. 1950), and Richard Levis McCormick (b. 1947), who was the 19th president of Rutgers University. After Richard L. McCormick became a history professor at Rutgers in the mid-1970s, the two McCormicks taught at least one history course together on American political history.

== Works ==
- Experiment in Independence: New Jersey in the Critical Period, 1781-1789. Rutgers University studies in history, v. 6. New Brunswick, N.J: Rutgers University Press. 1950. ISBN 978-0-8135-0729-3. LCCN 50007186. OCLC 581387.
- The History of Voting in New Jersey: A Study of the Development of Election Machinery, 1664-1911. Rutgers University studies in history, v. 8. New Brunswick, N.J: Rutgers University Press. 1953. LCCN 54007430. OCLC 906074787.
- New Jersey from Colony to State, 1609-1789 (1st ed.—Princeton, New Jersey: Van Nostrand, 1964; 2nd ed.—New Brunswick, New Jersey: Rutgers University Press, 1970). ISBN 0-8135-0662-X
- The Second American Party System: Party Formations in the Jacksonian Era (Chapel Hill, North Carolina:University of North Carolina Press, 1966). ISBN 0-8078-0977-2
- Rutgers: A Bicentennial History (New Brunswick, New Jersey: Rutgers University Press, 1966). ISBN 0-8135-0521-6
- The Selected Speeches of Mason Welch Gross with Richard Schlatter. (New Brunswick, New Jersey: Rutgers University Press, 1980). ISBN 0-87855-388-6
- The Presidential Game: The Origins of American Presidential Politics (New York: Oxford University Press, 1982). ISBN 0-19-503455-4
- The Case of the Nazi Professor with David M. Oshinsky and Daniel Horn (New Brunswick, New Jersey: Rutgers University Press, 1989). ISBN 0-8135-1427-4
- The Black Student Protest Movement at Rutgers (New Brunswick, New Jersey: Rutgers University Press, 1990). ISBN 0-8135-1575-0
- McCormick, Katheryne C., ed. (1994). Equality Deferred: Women Candidates for the New Jersey Assembly, 1920-1993. New Brunswick, N.J: Center for the American Woman and Politics, Eagleton Institute of Politics, Rutgers, the State University of New Jersey. OCLC 32677532.

== Sources ==
- Birkner, Michael J. McCormick of Rutgers: Scholar, Teacher, Public Historian (Greenwood Press, 2001). ISBN 0-313-30356-8
- Richard P. McCormick Papers, 1929-2006 in Special Collections and University Archives, Rutgers University.
- View from the Inside by Thomas Frusciano in Rutgers Magazine (Winter 2006).
- Richard P. McCormick, Beloved Rutgers Professor and University Historian, Dies from Perspectives (American Historical Association).
