= Samuel L. Stanley =

American physician (born 1954)

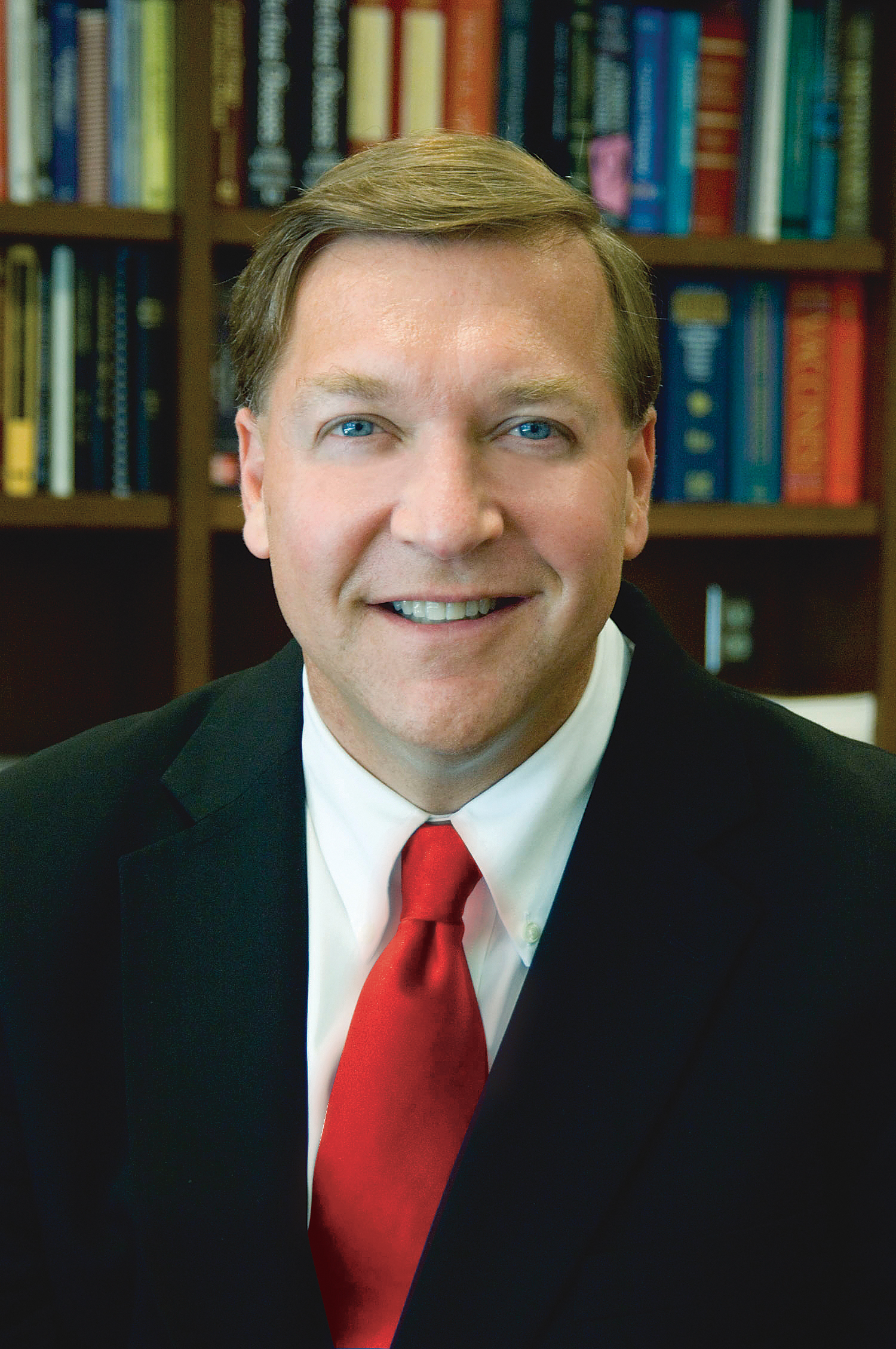
- Stanley in 2014

21st President of Michigan State University
- In office August 1, 2019 – November 4, 2022
- Preceded by: Lou Anna Simon; John Engler (interim); Satish Udpa (acting)
- Succeeded by: Teresa Woodruff (interim); Kevin Guskiewicz

5th President of Stony Brook University
- In office July 1, 2009 – July 31, 2019
- Preceded by: Shirley Strum Kenny
- Succeeded by: Michael A. Bernstein (interim); Maurie D. McInnis

Personal details
- Born: Samuel Leonard Stanley Jr. January 11, 1954 (age 72) Seattle, Washington, U.S.
- Education: University of Chicago (BA); Harvard University (MD)
- Scientific career
- Fields: Internal medicine
- Institutions: Washington University in St. Louis; Stony Brook University

Samuel L. Stanley Jr. (born January 11, 1954) is an American educator and biomedical researcher. He was president of Stony Brook University from 2009 to 2019 and then Michigan State University from 2019 to November 2022. Stanley is one of the founding directors of the Midwest Regional Center of Excellence for Biodefense and Emerging Infectious Diseases Research.

On October 13, 2022, Stanley announced his resignation as president of Michigan State University, and stepped down on November 4, 2022.

== Early life and education ==
Samuel L. Stanley Jr. attended Winston Churchill High School, located in Potomac, Maryland, and graduated in 1972. He then attended the University of Chicago, where he graduated with honors in biological sciences in 1976 and was inducted into Phi Beta Kappa in the same year. As an Albert Schweitzer fellow of Harvard Medical School, Stanley received his M.D. specializing in internal medicine in 1980.

== Career ==
He served as a medical intern at Massachusetts General Hospital between 1980 and 1981 and stayed to complete his residency in Internal Medicine at Massachusetts General Hospital. He was appointed as an associate member of the American College of Physicians. During his time at Mass General, Stanley met colleague and future wife, Dr. Ellen Li, who was concurrently completing her residency in internal medicine.

Between 1983 and 1984, Stanley was a fellow in infectious diseases at Washington University School of Medicine in St. Louis, Missouri. While there, he was a Pfizer Postdoctoral Fellow in microbiology and immunology. He became a professor in the department of medicine, and served in the Division of Infectious Diseases and Department of Molecular Microbiology. Stanley also served as director of the National Institutes of Health-funded Midwest Regional Center of Excellence for Biodefense and Emerging Infectious Diseases Research. In 2006, he was named vice-chancellor for research at Washington University in St. Louis.

=== President of Stony Brook University ===
On May 12, 2009, Stanley was named the fifth president of Stony Brook University, a position he formally assumed on July 1, 2009, making him the first physician to serve as Stony Brook University's president.

Stanley's tenure at Stony Brook was marked by enhancing the faculty, boosting minority and low-income student enrollment, raising academic success rates, and increasing research funding and the university's endowment level. Stony Brook University saw its largest donation in school and State University of New York history when mathematician Jim Simons gifted $150 million to the school. In 2012, Stanley and his wife announced the establishment of the Ellen Li and Samuel S. Stanley Jr. Endowed Scholarship in the Stony Brook University School of Medicine. He also associated the university with the United Nations HeForShe program and committed the university to addressing gender equity issues.

Upon Stanley's arrival, Stony Brook faced a $13 million budget deficit which grew to $21 million and led to a hiring freeze in December 2009 and closure of the 81-acre campus in Southampton in 2010. Students brought suit to the university over the closure, resulting in a settlement which included a public apology by Stanley and an agreement to maintain an environmental degree program the students were enrolled in. By 2017, Stony Brook's budget deficit grew to $35 million which led to development of a budget plan which included controversial cuts to the university's humanities funding.

According to the Chronicle of Higher Education, Stanley's salary was $690,040 during the 2014–15 school year and ranked the 25th-highest amongst public university executives in the United States; from 2009 to 2012, the Stony Brook Foundation awarded Stanley $250,000 in addition to his base salary.

In January 2015, Stanley began his term on the NCAA Division I board of directors. On July 19, 2016, Stanley was appointed to the NCAA board of governors. The board adopted a sexual violence policy in 2017 and in 2018 heard recommendations to tie athlete eligibility to behavior, but took no immediate action. Stanley's term expired in 2018 and in 2020 the board expanded the NCAA's sexual violence policy to require student-athletes to annually disclose any investigations or disciplinary matters in their past.

=== President of Michigan State University ===
Stanley was named president of Michigan State University on May 28, 2019, to succeed Lou Anna Simon, who resigned in the wake of the Larry Nassar scandal, with his tenure officially beginning on August 1. On August 29, 2019, two Michigan State students were charged with false terrorism threats after posting a plan to assassinate Stanley on the Michigan State subreddit.

The new president said early in his tenure that his top priority was to make Michigan State as safe, respectful and welcoming as it can be. Meeting with and listening to members of the university community, including conversations with groups of sexual assault survivors, was a focus of his first months at MSU. Feedback from those survivor sessions was also meant to help develop recommendations to improve the university's handling of sexual assault and formulate a comprehensive plan. Late in 2019, Stanley announced two new institutional planning initiatives, one focused on issues of diversity, equity, and inclusion and the other a comprehensive university strategic planning process. He also launched an initiative in late 2019 to investigate development of a campus multicultural center.

Stanley restructured administration of the university's medical, osteopathic and nursing colleges and its clinical services in October 2019 to improve oversight and alignment of health care, education, and research activities. The university broke ground Nov. 18, 2019 on a $19.5 million, gift-funded medical innovation facility next to MSU's $88.1 million Grand Rapids Research Center and close to its College of Human Medicine in downtown Grand Rapids.

Stanley announced his resignation from Michigan State on October 13, 2022, stating that he no longer had confidence in the university's board of trustees. Some members of the board had been pressing him to retire, based on their criticism of his handling of the case of a dean in the Broad College of Business, who had been made to leave after allegations of sexual misconduct. Stanley's resignation was scheduled to take effect on January 11, 2023, but his last day was November 4, 2022. He was the third MSU president in a row to tender his resignation since January 2018.

=== Biomedical research ===
Stanley was a biomedical researcher. His research interest in immunity from infections led him to publish several articles about the characterization of key proteins and pathways involved in amebic, bacterial and viral infections, blood-borne pathogen risks in hemophilia therapy, and the identification of new strain- specific clones. Better defense against infection was a key focus of his research.

In 2008, he worked to create the Midwest Regional Center for Excellence in Biodefense and Emerging Infectious Diseases Research, with a $37 million grant from the National Institutes of Health. The center was established with goals of improving biodefense, in reaction to the post-September 11 bioterrorism threat and anthrax attacks. He has also served on the National Science Advisory Board for Biosecurity, the NIH Blue Ribbon Panel on the New England Infectious Diseases Research Laboratory, the NIH National Advisory Allergy & Infectious Diseases Council and committees led by the United States Department of Commerce.

Stanley is also the recipient of awards, including the Burroughs Wellcome Scholar Award in Molecular Parasitology and the Distinguished Service Teaching Award from Washington University. Stanley is currently the owner of 3 patents. He also serves as an ambassador for the Paul G. Rogers Society for Global Health Research and has received an honorary doctorate degree in Science from Konkuk University in South Korea.

== Personal life ==
Stanley is married to Ellen Li, a practicing gastroenterologist and active researcher.
