= Richard Levis McCormick =

American historian and academic administrator

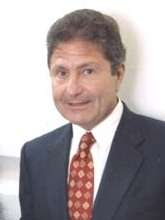
- McCormick in 2003

Interim President of Stony Brook University
- In office 1 August 2024 – 31 July 2025
- Preceded by: Maurie D. McInnis
- Succeeded by: Andrea Goldsmith

19th President of Rutgers University
- In office 2002–2012

28th President of the University of Washington
- In office September 1, 1995 – October 25, 2002
- Preceded by: Francis Leo Lawrence
- Succeeded by: Robert Lawrence Barchi

Personal details
- Born: December 26, 1947 (age 78) New Brunswick, New Jersey
- Spouse: Joan Barry McCormick
- Parent(s): Richard Patrick McCormick; Katheryne C. Levis
- Education: Amherst College (BA); Yale University (PhD)

Richard Levis McCormick (born December 26, 1947) is an American historian and university administrator. He served as the interim president of Stony Brook University from 2024 to 2025, as the 19th president of Rutgers University from 2002 to 2012, as the 28th president of the University of Washington from 1995 to 2002, and as the provost of the University of North Carolina at Chapel Hill from 1992 to 1995.

== Early life and education ==
The son of Richard Patrick McCormick, a Rutgers professor and administrator, and Katheryne C. Levis, a University administrator, Richard Levis McCormick was born in New Brunswick, New Jersey.

After graduating from Piscataway Township High School in Piscataway, New Jersey, McCormick earned his Bachelor of Arts from Amherst College in American studies (1969) and subsequently a Ph.D. in history (1976) from Yale University.

== Academic career ==
=== Rutgers faculty ===
McCormick served on the Rutgers University History faculty from 1976 to 1992, including three years as Dean of the Faculty of Arts and Sciences. He team-taught an American history course with his father, Richard P. McCormick. In 1985, he held a John Simon Guggenheim Memorial Foundation Fellowship as well as a Woodrow Wilson International Center for Scholars Fellowship.

=== UNC-Chapel Hill ===
McCormick served as vice chancellor and provost at the University of North Carolina at Chapel Hill from 1992 to 1995. His tenure was marked by the settlement of a controversy over a proposed Black Cultural Center. More than a dozen students were arrested in a sit-in protest demanding construction of the facility, which opponents viewed as an attempt to create a separatist facility. McCormick won campuswide support by emphasizing the academic aspects of the center and helped initiate a fundraising campaign to build it. The Sonja Haynes Stone Center for Black Culture and History opened in 2004.

=== University of Washington ===
McCormick served as the 28th president of the University of Washington from September 1, 1995 to October 25, 2002. Although hampered by declining state funding, McCormick promoted undergraduate research and helped boost UW's six-year graduation rate from 67 percent in 1995 to 72 percent in 2000. He launched an annual faculty bus tour to encourage the university to adopt a statewide perspective. Research funding and private giving reached record levels in McCormick's tenure, but he was unable to prevent passage of a 1998 statewide initiative, Initiative 200, ending the university's affirmative action programs.

When McCormick announced his intent to take a position at Rutgers, he became the first UW president in 50 years to leave for another university. McCormick's departure from the University of Washington was prompted, in part, by pressure from the UW Board of Regents regarding an affair McCormick had with a coworker during his presidency.

=== Rutgers University ===
McCormick took office as Rutgers president in December 2002 and stepped down in June 2012. His tenure was highlighted by two far-reaching initiatives: the reorganization and strengthening of undergraduate education on the university's largest campus, New Brunswick, and the passage of state legislation to merge nearly all of the University of Medicine and Dentistry of New Jersey into Rutgers.

In 2004, McCormick launched a campuswide discussion of the university's responsibility to undergraduate students, insisting that they receive the full benefits of the university's mission as a research university. In 2006, the university's Board of Governors approved his plan to reorganize the undergraduate colleges on the New Brunswick campus into a School of Arts and Sciences and School of Environmental and Biological Sciences, eliminating contradictory admissions and curriculum standards among these undergraduate colleges and emphasizing faculty-student interaction. Some students and alumni criticized the plan, arguing that it sacrifices Rutgers' unique institutional history and culture. The plan went into effect during the 2007–2008 academic year.

In January 2011, McCormick praised the recommendations of the New Jersey Higher Education Task Force, which proposed merging Rutgers with the Robert Wood Johnson Medical School and two other units of the University of Medicine and Dentistry of New Jersey. A year later, in January 2012, New Jersey Gov. Chris Christie and a medical-education advisory committee appointed by Christie endorsed the merger proposal but also called for the merger of Rutgers' Camden campus into Rowan University. The final bill maintained the Camden campus as part of Rutgers while increasing the number of UMDNJ units being absorbed into Rutgers to include all but University Hospital in Newark and the School of Osteopathic Medicine in Stratford. The legislation, signed by Gov. Christie and approved by the Rutgers governing boards in 2012, took effect July 1, 2013.

McCormick's tenure was noted for his efforts to broaden and deepen the university's connections with New Jersey. He targeted research areas of particular interest to the state (transportation, nutrition, homeland security, climate change), and in 2008 announced Rutgers Against Hunger , an initiative to stock food banks in the state, provide consumer education on nutrition, and help community organizations fight hunger. In 2009 he launched Rutgers Day , an annual public event highlighting Rutgers academic, research, cultural, and recreational programs.

In 2008, McCormick established the Rutgers Future Scholars Program in conjunction with a series of initiatives designed to increase the diversity of the university population. Each year, a new cohort of fifty rising eighth-grade students from each of the university's host cities of Newark, Camden, New Brunswick, and Piscataway begins a five-year process of regular visits to campus, college preparation activities, and mentoring, with the guarantee of free tuition at Rutgers for all those who earn admission after high school. Of the first cohort of 183 students in the program, 163 enrolled in college in fall 2013, including 98 at Rutgers.

During McCormick's presidency, the university's annual budget grew from $1.3 billion to $2.1 billion despite declining levels of state funding. He made new investments in Rutgers’ campuses, responding to student demand for additional housing, classroom repairs, and renovated or expanded student-life facilities. The Rutgers School of Law–Camden opened a new facility in 2008, and the Rutgers Business School—Newark and New Brunswick moved into a new home at One Washington Park in Newark in 2009.

In 2007 McCormick announced plans for redevelopment of the Livingston Campus in Piscataway, New Jersey, focused on professional education; a 2008 anonymous gift of $13 million, the second largest private gift in Rutgers’ history, has been earmarked for a new business school facility on that campus.

In 2006 he held an international design competition to “green” the College Avenue Campus in New Brunswick, New Jersey. Some detractors said the designs, including those of the winning firm, were too modern for the historic campus, but others praised the proposed use of open space and planned transportation improvements. McCormick suspended the greening project in 2009, citing budgetary problems:

"All of the other projects that we bring to you for your approval — the dining hall on [Livingston] campus, the proteomics building and the Nelson [Biology Laboratories C-wing] all come with revenue streams…. There's no revenue stream for the greening of College Avenue unless you charge students for walking past bushes and trees…. I regret this, but we have no other choice," McCormick said.

In 2012 he announced a multifaceted project that, contingent on the success of its proposed funding plan, would add an honors college, an academic classroom building, a residence hall, and a dining hall to the College Avenue Campus.

In 2010, McCormick launched a $1 billion university fundraising campaign titled Our Rutgers, Our Future: A Campaign for Excellence. Two-thirds of the campaign goal was raised during McCormick's tenure, the largest donation being a $27 million gift for endowed professorships.

On May 31, 2011, McCormick submitted his formal resignation to the university Board of Governors, which took effect June 30, 2012. McCormick's successor effective September 1, 2012, Robert L. Barchi, was announced and appointed on April 11, 2012.

McCormick has returned to teaching history in Rutgers' Graduate School of Education. He wrote a book titled Raised at Rutgers: A President's Story, which was published by the Rutgers University Press in October 2014.

=== Stony Brook University ===
On July 16, 2024, the Office of President of Stony Brook University issued an announcement naming McCormick as interim President effective August 1. He served for one year and was succeeded by Andrea Goldsmith.

== Personal life ==
He is married to Joan Barry McCormick, a 1988 Rutgers alumna and professional fundraiser whose undergraduate degree is in journalism, with a master's degree in public administration from Kean University. McCormick has three children, Betsy, Michael, and Katie. Two of them are from his previous marriage to Suzanne Lebsock, a retired professor of history at Rutgers. He had been married to Lebsock since 1984.

== Published works ==
- McCormick, Richard L. (1981). From realignment to reform: political change in New York State 1893-1910. Ithaca, N.Y: Cornell University Press. ISBN 978-0-8014-1326-1.
- Link, Arthur S.; MacCormick, Richard L. (1993). Progressivism. The American history series (7. print ed.). Arlington Heights, Ill: Davidson. ISBN 978-0-88295-814-9.
- McCormick, Richard L. (1984). Political parties and the modern state. New Brunswick, N.J: Rutgers university press. ISBN 978-0-8135-1027-9.
- McCormick, Richard L. (1989). The party period and public policy: American politics from the age of Jackson to the progressive era (1. publ ed.). New York: Oxford Univ. Pr. ISBN 978-0-19-504784-4.
- MacCormick, Richard L. (1997). Public life in industrial America, 1877 - 1917. Washington, D.C: American Historical Association. ISBN 978-0-87229-091-4.
- McCormick, Richard L. (2014). Raised at Rutgers: a President's Story. Rivergate Regionals Collection. Piscataway: Rutgers University Press. ISBN 978-0-8135-6474-6.
